= Bellevue Conference (September 11, 1917) =

Council of the German Imperial Crown convened in Berlin

Bellevue conference (September 11, 1917)
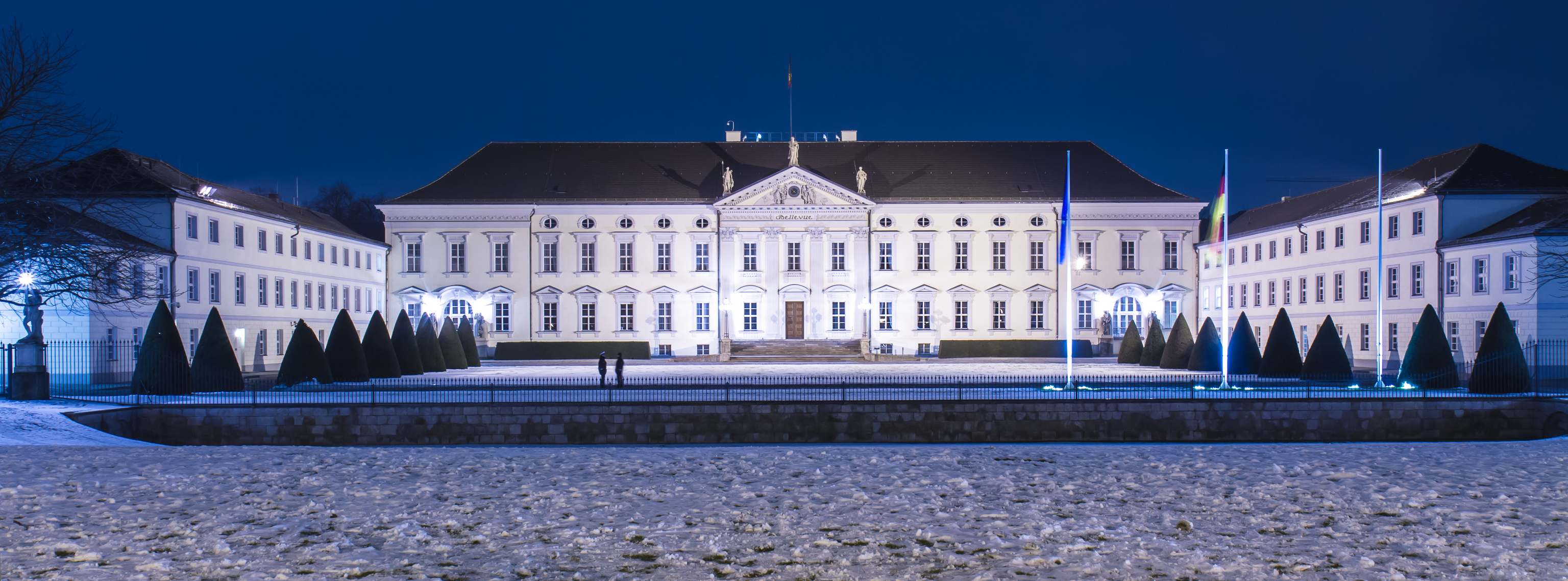
- Bellevue Palace in 2013.
- Date: September 11, 1917
- Location: Berlin, German Empire
- Type: Strategy meeting
- Participants: Wilhelm II; Georg Michaelis; Richard von Kühlmann; Paul von Hindenburg; Erich Ludendorff; Oskar von der Lancken-Wakenitz

The Bellevue Conference of September 11, 1917, was a council of the German Imperial Crown convened in Berlin, at Bellevue Palace, (Note: Fritz Fischer specifically mentions the "Bellevue conference of September 11, 1917".) under the chairmanship of Wilhelm II. This meeting of civilians and military personnel was convened by German Emperor (Note: The German Imperial Constitution conferred the title of German Emperor on the King of Prussia.) Wilhelm II to determine the Imperial Reich's new war aims policy, (Note: Between 1871 and 1945, the official name of the German national state was Deutsches Reich, later simply referred to as Reich.) in a context marked by the February Revolution and the publication of Pope Benedict XV's note on August 1, 1917; the question of the fate of Belgium, then almost totally occupied by the Reich, quickly focused the participants' attention. Finally, this meeting also had to define the terms of the German response to the papal note, calling on the belligerents to put an end to armed confrontation.

== Context ==
=== Redefining war aims ===
Following the fall of the monarchy in Russia, two trends emerged among German leaders on the question of the Reich's war aims. The first, organized until July 13, 1917 around Imperial Chancellor Theobald von Bethmann Hollweg, advocated placing the Reich's neighbors under trusteeship, by means of political, economic and commercial agreements respecting their legal independence, but subjecting them to a very tight political, economic and commercial regime: Richard von Kühlmann, then State Secretary for Foreign Affairs, Karl Helfferich, supported by Chancellor Georg Michaelis from his meeting with the Austro-Hungarians on August 14. Paul von Hindenburg and Erich Ludendorff, the Dioscuri, supported by the parliamentary right and the Pangermanists, justified their position by the "Kreuznach Protocol", approved on April 23, 1917 by Theobald von Bethmann-Hollweg, and demanded extensive annexations in Europe, in Belgium, France, Poland and the Baltic states.

Parallel to these internal debates within the German government, on August 30, 1917, the nuncio in Bavaria, Eugenio Pacelli, officially delivered to Georg Michaelis the British reply to the peace note of August 1. In this unofficial reply, the British government expressed its support for the restoration of Belgium to its 1914 borders, making the then-occupied kingdom a "node of peace", and for the modification of the Franco-German border in Alsace-Lorraine in favor of France; the British reply remained evasive on the delineation of Russian borders with the Reich, Austria-Hungary and the Ottoman Empire.

=== Desire for peace ===
During the spring and summer of 1917, a feeling of weariness swept through the German population.

The first strike broke out in Berlin's munitions factories on April 5, 1917. Hostile to Chancellor Theobald von Bethmann Hollweg's policy of appeasement towards the Socialists, Erich Ludendorff, the main driving force behind the German High Command, obtained his dismissal on July 12, 1917, and his replacement by Georg Michaelis. At the same time as replacing Bethmann-Hollweg, Ludendorff ensured that the peace resolution passed by the Reichstag on July 19, 1917 was sufficiently imprecise to leave room for interpretation.

Furthermore, on August 1, Pope Benedict XV had issued a call for peace based on the territorial status quo of 1914. This appeal, which met with hostility from the Allies, prompted the Reich, after consulting its central power allies, (Note: Historian Pierre Renouvin defines the Quadruplice as the Central Powers in the period between October 5, 1915 and September 29, 1918, the chronological limits of Bulgarian intervention in the world war.) to clarify the war aims of the Central Powers.

Finally, on August 30, Ottokar Czernin, Austro-Hungarian Foreign Minister, informed Richard von Kühlmann of his intention to meet Paul Painlevé, President of the French Council, in Switzerland, to work out a peace plan between the allies on the one hand, and the dual monarchy on the other. This news prompted the Secretary of State to make an urgent trip to Vienna the following day to sound out his Austro-Hungarian counterpart: in a note dated September 3, Richard von Kühlmann expressed concern about the ties between the Reich and its main ally, whose position required the implementation of a strategy of rapprochement with Great Britain.

=== Meeting preparation ===
Since mid-August, the Imperial Chancellor, Georg Michaelis, had been increasing his contacts with the Reich's main political leaders to justify his position on the Papal Note; indeed, he visited the Western Front and met with the Prussian and Bavarian Kronprinz, heads of two major armies engaged on the Western Front. The Chancellor returned to Berlin with their agreement on the policy he was to pursue in Belgium.

At the same time, Karl Helfferich, then Vice-Chancellor and State Secretary for the Interior, asked Oskar von der Lancken-Wakenitz, the officer in charge of Belgium's military governor, for a memorandum on German plans in Belgium. In this text, the governor advocated the restoration of Belgium as an independent kingdom, in return for which the Reich would have "political and military guarantees", including control of Antwerp and its rail link with the Reich, owned by the Prussian rail administration.

== Participants ==
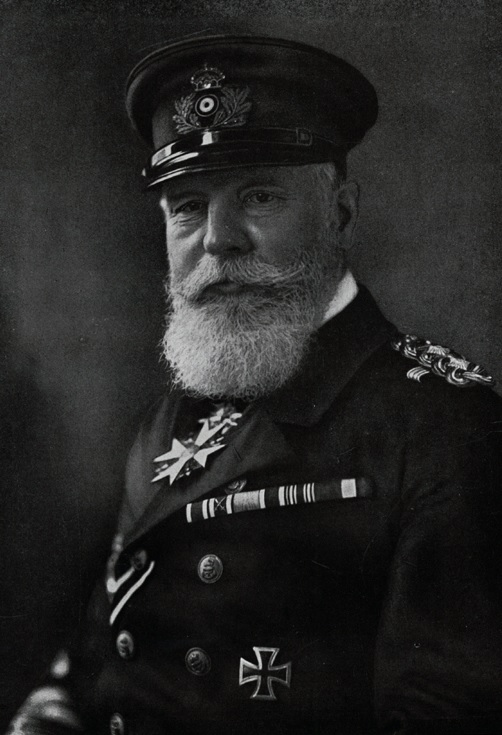
Henning von Holtzendorff, Commander-in-Chief of the Navy, 1918.

Convened by Emperor Wilhelm II, the conference brought together, under his chairmanship, Kronprinz Wilhelm, Imperial Chancellor Georg Michaelis and his new Secretary of State, Richard von Kühlmann. (Note: He took office on August 7, 1917.)

The High Command was represented by Henning von Holtzendorff, then Commander-in-Chief of the Navy, and the Dioscuri, Paul von Hindenburg, Erich Ludendorff. Oskar von der Lancken-Wakenitz, a diplomat based in Brussels, represented the General Governor of Belgium.

== Discussions ==
=== Mitteleuropa's constitution ===
The annexation of Austrian Silesia would, according to Erich Ludendorff, lead to the strengthening of German control over the dual monarchy.

This conference was Ludendorff's first opportunity to set out his vision of peace following a German victory. In his eyes, a broad program of annexations was the first step towards the realization of a political project, Mitteleuropa, underpinned by the implementation of an economic program aimed at organizing an autarkic system under German leadership. His program included extensive annexations of the Baltic states, which he saw as rich agricultural territories. Finally, to strengthen the Reich's hold on the dual monarchy, Ludendorff advocated the annexation of Austrian Silesia to Prussia, the Troppau circle for its industrial wealth, and the Teschen circle for its geographical position, giving the Reich a common border with Hungary.

These eastern annexations were accompanied by an equally maximalist western program. Indeed, the military present advocated extensive annexations in Belgium, including its port, Antwerp, and a portion of the Flemish coast, linked to the Reich by a corridor enjoying extraterritoriality.

=== Control over Belgium ===
Paul von Hindenburg wanted to annex the Belgian regions on the right bank of the Meuse and the area around Liège on the left bank (map of the Meuse basin).

Erich Ludendorff and Hening von Holtzendorff wanted to establish political and military control over the Kingdom of Belgium. Ludendorff was a staunch advocate of annexing all Belgian territory on the right bank of the Meuse to the Reich; Paul von Hindenburg expressly defined Liège and the surrounding area on the left bank as a region to be permanently occupied by the Reich, regardless of its status. For his part, Hening von Holtzendorff, Commander-in-Chief of the German Navy, emphasized the need for the victorious Reich to control the entire Belgian coast for a very long time after the end of the conflict.

Faced with this maximalist position, the government representatives were unable to impose the definition of a compromise policy for possible peace negotiations with the Allies. Thus, they failed to promote the division of Belgium into two states, Flanders and Wallonia, linked together by a simple personal union, and to integrate them into the German zone of economic influence in Europe.

=== Discrepancies ===
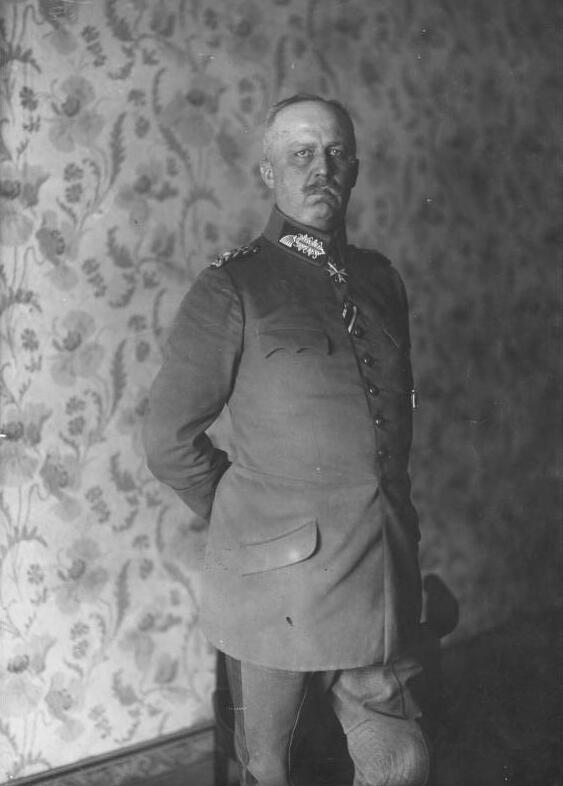
Erich Ludendorff, pictured here in 1915, wanted extensive annexations in Belgium.

At this conference, the question of the nature of German control over Belgium was raised. In fact, these differences were identical to those which had led the military to demand, and obtain, the dismissal of Theobald von Bethmann Hollweg.

At the time, he advocated the establishment of long-term economic control, guaranteed by political, economic and military agreements, formally respecting Belgian independence. This program was taken up by his successor, with modifications to take account of certain demands from the federated states: Prussia's trusteeship of the Belgian railroads and the majority participation of German capital in certain Belgian companies deemed strategic by Prussian and Bavarian economic experts were the main additions to Theobald von Bethmann-Hollweg's war aims before his dismissal. Nevertheless, the leading figures in the civilian government were hostile to any major annexation at the expense of the Kingdom of Belgium, preferring to set up an indirect trusteeship, which they considered more flexible.

The military, Erich Ludendorff and Henning von Holtzendorff, respectively First Quarter-Master General of the German Army and Commander-in-Chief of the German Navy, were in favor of extensive annexations in Belgium, a long-term occupation of the Belgian coastline, the dismantling of the kingdom's war industry, and the conclusion of technical agreements aimed at integrating Belgium into the Reich. These agreements would comprise three economic and commercial components: a monetary treaty, a river agreement and a railway agreement, all designed to integrate the Belgian state into the political and economic sphere that the Reich aspired to establish in Europe. The monetary part would institute a fixed exchange rate between the Belgian franc and the Reichsmark, the fluvial part would reorganize Belgian river trade regulations according to Reich law, while the provisions imposed on Belgium in the railway sector would place Belgian railroads under the strict control of the Prussian railway administration.

== Outcome ==
=== Mail of September 12 ===
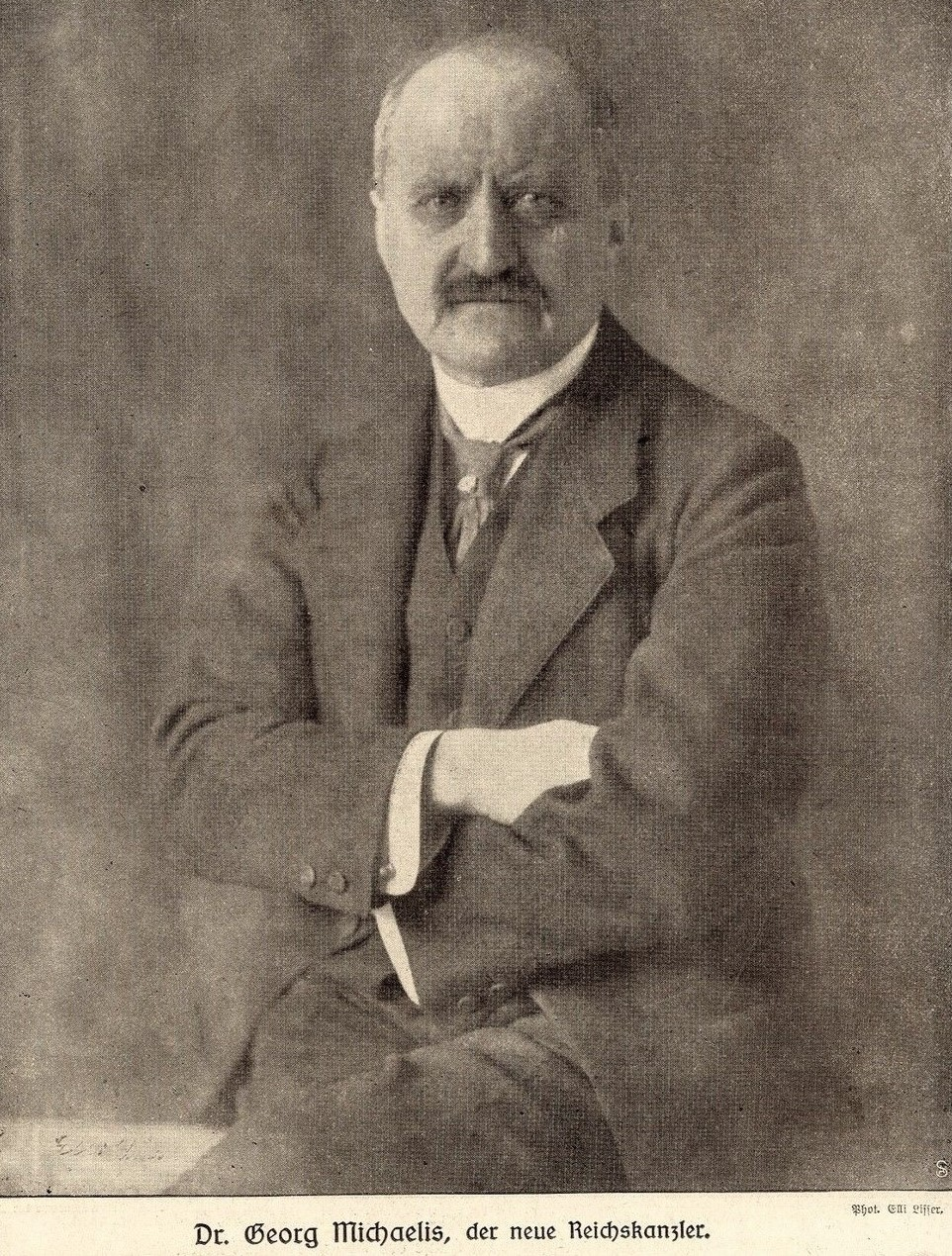
Georg Michaelis, shown here in 1917, wrote a report on the meeting in the form of a letter from Wilhelm II to the military.

No official report of the conference was drawn up; however, the very next day, Georg Michaelis drafted a letter for Paul von Hindenburg and Henning von Holtzendorff, which he submitted to the German monarch for signature.

Georg Michaelis summarized the progress achieved by the government. In this letter, the Chancellor presented the differences between civilians and the military as a point of form, and questioned the nature of the "renunciations" that the Reich would be obliged to accept.

This letter constituted Wilhelm II's official position on the question of Belgium, the main subject of the conference. In fact, the Chancellor and his State Secretary succeeded in imposing on the Emperor a wording in line with their views: the abandonment of the Belgian coast, with the exception of Zeebrugge, was thus approved by the sovereign.

Georg Michaelis proposed a new program of war aims, moderated in Western Europe, which he believed would secure British withdrawal from the conflict. This proposal represented a clear victory for the imperial government over the Dioscuri, the representatives of the military. However, on September 15, the military retaliated by once again proposing a war goal involving extensive annexations in Europe, including the annexation of Liège, which Hindenburg had renounced on the 11th.

=== A new war aims program ===
In the face of pressure from the Reichstag majority in favor of peace, Germany's top military leaders favored the realization of vast war aims in the West, resulting in the establishment of a firm German trusteeship over Belgium and negating the reality of its independence. Nevertheless, the civilians succeeded in getting the military to renounce these extensive annexations, in favor of a policy guaranteeing the Reich and its economy free access to the resources of the world market, including the negotiation of favorable trade clauses during peace talks with the Allies.

The letter of September 12, 1917, expressing the Kaiser's official position, listed German war aims at this stage of the conflict. According to Georg Michaelis, the author of this letter, the Reich's western borders were strengthened by the conflict, while access to the port of Antwerp was made possible by the control of several of the rail routes leading to it from the Ruhr, the Saar and Aachen. At the same time, Flamingo propaganda was encouraged, giving German officials in Brussels the legal means to pursue an ambitious policy aimed at Belgium's Flemish population.

Finally, the Lorraine basin, while nominally remaining French, would be subject to strict German political and economic control, based in law on the clauses of the peace treaties.

While this new program did not fundamentally call into question the Reich's objectives in Europe, it did mark a break in the definition of German war aims: from this point onwards, civil government officials, with the support of Wilhelm II, succeeded in imposing on the military the establishment of indirect German tutelage over all the Reich's neighbors, reinforced by limited annexations on German borders.

== See also ==
- Bellevue Palace, Germany
- Germany's Aims in the First World War
- Georg Michaelis

== Bibliography ==
- Bogdan, Henry (2014). Le Kaiser Guillaume II: Dernier empereur d'Allemagne (in French). Paris: Tallandier. ISBN 979-10-210-0517-4.
- Fischer, Fritz (1970). Les Buts de guerre de l'Allemagne impériale (1914–1918) (in French). Translated by Geneviève Migeon et Henri Thiès. Paris: Éditions de Trévise. BNF: 35255571j.
- Mommsen, Wolgang J. (1968). "L'opinion allemande et la chute du gouvernement Bethmann-Hollweg". Revue d'histoire moderne et contemporaine (in French). 15 (1): 39–53. doi:10.3406/rhmc.1968.3328.
- Renouvin, Pierre (1934). La Crise européenne et la Première Guerre mondiale. Peuples et civilisations (in French). Paris: Presses universitaires de France. BNF: 33152114f.
- Soutou, Georges-Henri (1989). L'or et le sang: Les Buts de guerre économiques de la Première Guerre mondiale (in French). Paris: Fayard. ISBN 2-213-02215-1.
