= Bingen Conference (July 31, 1917) =

German governmental meeting to define German policy in the Baltic territories

- Date: July 31, 1917
- Location: Bingen am Rhein
- Type: Strategy meeting
- Participants: Wilhelm II, Georg Michaelis, Richard von Kühlmann, Paul von Hindenburg, Erich Ludendorff.

The Bingen Conference was a German governmental meeting, held in Bingen am Rhein on 31 July 1917. (Note: From 1871 to 1945, the official name of the German state was Deutsches Reich. For the sake of convenience, the German Empire was subsequently referred to simply as the Reich.) It was convened by Georg Michaelis, the new Chancellor, at the initiative of Emperor Wilhelm II, in order to define German policy in the Baltic regions occupied by the German Imperial Army since its successes in 1915. This conference was the first opportunity for Michaelis as the new Chancellor, to meet the top military commanders, field marshal Paul von Hindenburg and general Erich Ludendorff. Having come to power after a political crisis caused by differences between his predecessor, Theobald von Bethmann Hollweg, the Reichstag, and the "Dioscuri" (Hindenburg and Ludendorff), (Note: These two soldiers appear inseparable, like the Dioscuri of Roman mythology.) Michaelis not only had to come to terms with the two actors in his predecessor's downfall but also had to define the war aims of the Reich government under the Oberste Heeresleitung (Supreme Army Command).

== Background ==
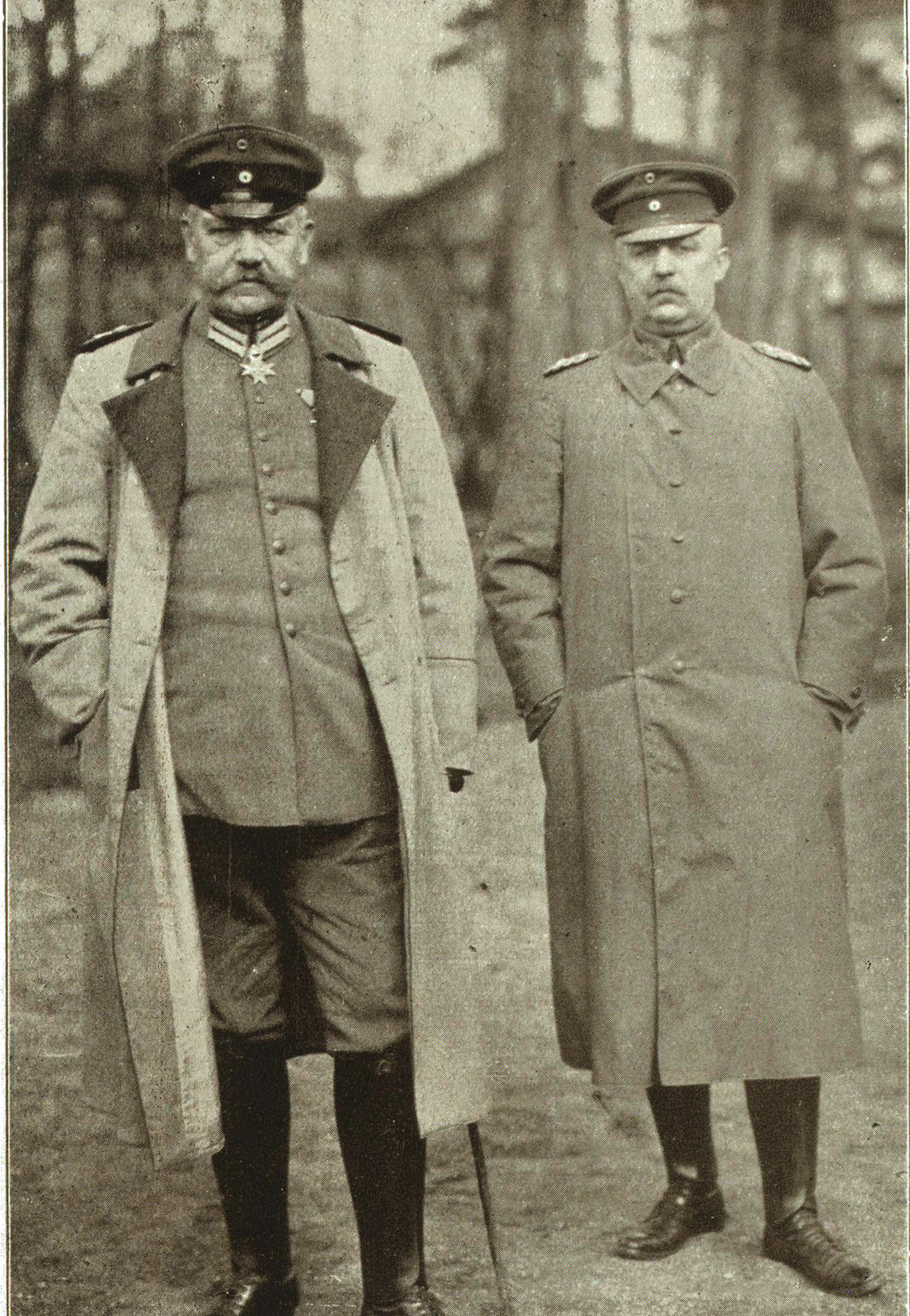
The Dioscuri, Paul von Hindenburg and Erich Ludendorff, January 1917.

=== Kreuznach program ===
Since the beginning of the war, the Baltic states had been a war target for the Reich; on April 23, 1917, at Kreuznach, the German government and military agreed to control the south as far as the outskirts of Riga, proposing a territorial exchange with Russia at the expense of the Dual Monarchy. (Note: Russia would annex Austrian Bukovina in exchange for German territorial gains in the Baltic states.)

According to the report of the April 23 conference, the Reich would extend its influence from Courland into Livonia and annex the Baltic islands at the entrance to the Gulf of Riga while blocking the territorial expansion of the new Kingdom of Poland by annexing Bialystock and the surrounding region to Prussia.

Despite these few strategic annexations, the form of the takeover of the Baltic states was a stumbling block between civilians and the military. Divided over the form of German rule over the Baltic states, German politicians and military men were in violent conflict, with the army favoring direct annexation and the civilians favoring indirect trusteeship.

=== The crisis of July 1917 ===
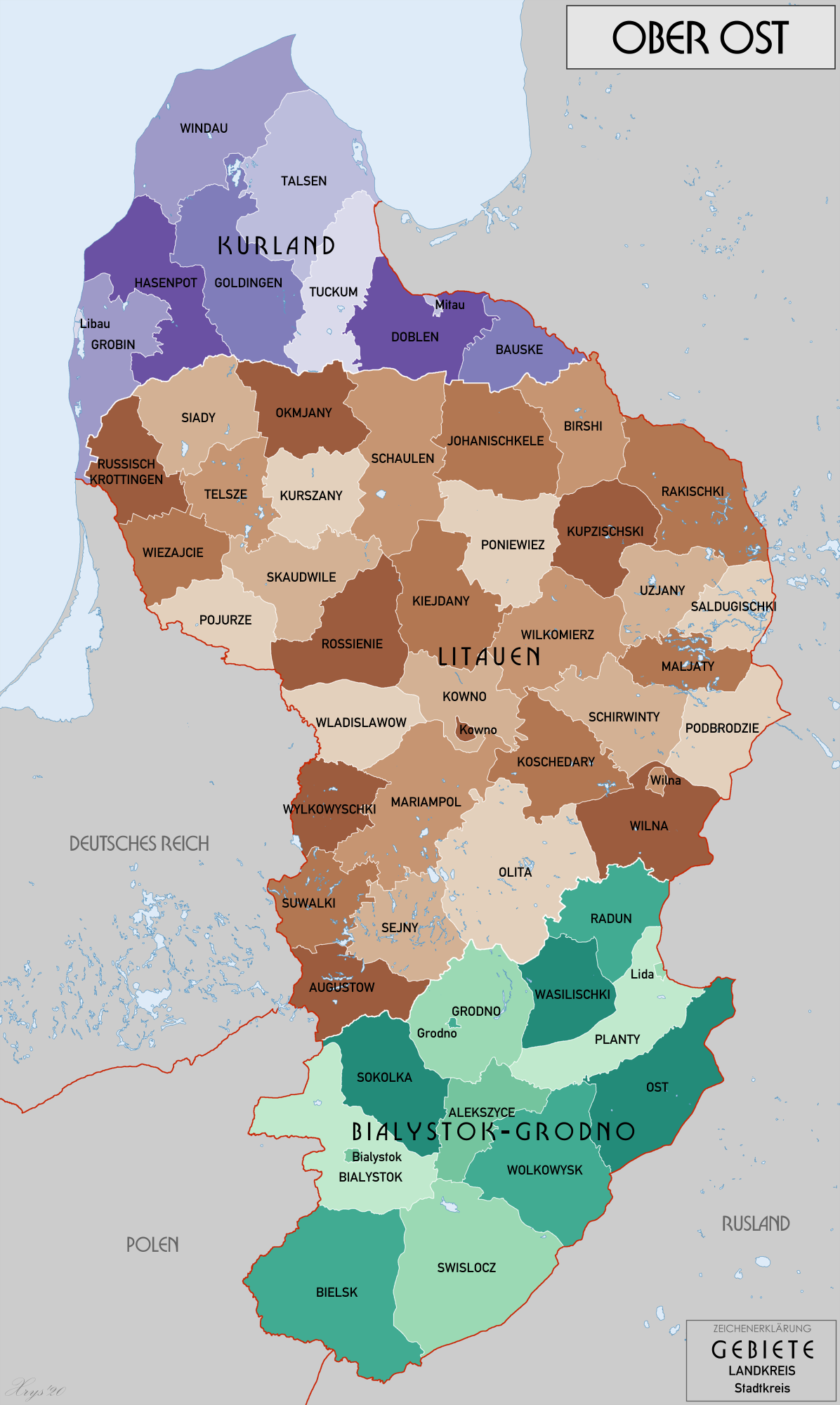
The territories were administered by the Ober Ost in early 1917.

In July 1917, a major institutional change took place in the Reich. The resignation of Theobald von Bethmann-Hollweg on July 13 marked the end of the Bethmann-Hollweg era and the beginning of a new era of military leadership. The successive chancellors were mere figureheads, with the army holding absolute power. The question of war aims became a point of contention for the Dioscuri (Paul von Hindenburg and Erich Ludendorff). Chancellor Bethmann-Hollweg had accepted the broad program of war aims defined at the April 23rd conference but described them as an unattainable goal, pitting the military and parliamentarians against him. Opposition to the Chancellor's policy intensified as the weeks passed since the April and May 1917 conferences. His opponents regrouped, and on July 13, the parliamentarians, Wilhelm of Prussia, and the Dioscuri obtained the Emperor's dismissal.

At the end of this political crisis, Georg Michaelis, then Supply Commissioner in the Prussian cabinet, who was relatively unknown to the population, was appointed Chancellor. He was recommended for the position by Theobald von Bethmann-Hollweg and appointed Reich Chancellor on the recommendation of Georg von Hertling, then Minister-President of the Kingdom of Bavaria. He also enjoyed the support of Erich Ludendorff and Paul von Hindenburg, who were prepared to accept "the first man in" to replace Bethmann-Hollweg. Nevertheless, the Dioscuri appreciated the outspokenness of the new Chancellor, who, from his very first statements to members of parliament, assumed his role as the Dioscuri's right-hand man among the Reich's political leaders.

=== Reich in Russia 1917 ===
Since the outbreak of the February Revolution, the Russian military has been unable to effectively pursue the war against the Central Powers due to a lack of discipline and desertions.

At the outset of the conflict, on April 19, 1917, Erich Ludendorff believed that the Russian provisional government, hindered by the deterioration of the military, was not contemplating any significant military operations. However, a final offensive launched on July 1, 1917, managed to disrupt the Austro-German front by 40 kilometers, a considerable success quickly overshadowed by the mutinies of the units responsible for exploiting the breakthrough and the subsequent counter-offensive.

Matthias Erzberger, a key figure in the peace negotiations, met several times with former State Councillor Joseph von Kolyschko, a cabinet member chaired by Serge Witte, through the intermediary of Polish industrialist Gurewicz. Their diplomatic efforts laid the foundations for peace negotiations between Russia and the Central Powers, a significant achievement amid war. The German and Russian envoys sought to conclude an "honorable peace for both parties", the details of which had yet to be defined. This included "border rectifications". However, Erzberger's efforts were met with opposition from Arthur Zimmermann and Wilhelm II, who were upset at being sidelined and hostile to the clauses negotiated by the German government envoy.

== Participants ==
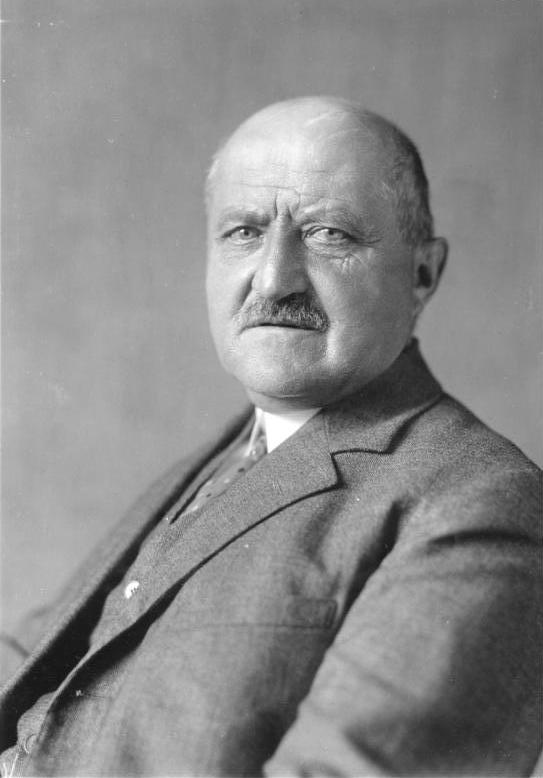
The new Reich Chancellor, Georg Michaelis, represented the government.

At Emperor Wilhelm II's behest, the military leadership of the German Reich, represented by the Dioscuri (Paul von Hindenburg and his deputy Erich Ludendorff), attended this government conference convened by the Reich government.

The Reich government was represented by the newly appointed Chancellor, Georg Michaelis, and by his State Secretary for Foreign Affairs, Richard von Kühlmann, assisted by their principal colleagues.

== Topics addressed ==
=== Empowering the Reich ===
In March and again in May 1917, Ottokar Czernin, the Austro-Hungarian Foreign Minister, and Theobald von Bethmann-Hollweg, the Reich Chancellor, reached an agreement to divide the quadruple's conquests in Europe between a German and an Austro-Hungarian zone of influence. This resulted in the Baltic states being placed in the German sphere of influence, regardless of whether these regions were formally independent or annexed to the Reich.

In exchange for German guardianship of Lithuania and Courland, Ottokar Czernin successfully negotiated Romania's inclusion in the Austro-Hungarian sphere of influence. At the same time, Ottokar Czernin undertook not to impede any "assertion of German power" in the Baltic regions and Russian Finland but also to support German claims. Once Czernin had guaranteed the division, the German government proceeded to limit any possible Austro-Hungarian interference in the region. (Note: Austro-Hungarian companies still hold some positions in the region, notably in shipbuilding and fishing.) The division prompted the Austro-Hungarians to request the immediate commencement of negotiations to define compensation for Austro-Hungarian companies operating in the Baltic states.

=== A new definition of the purposes of war ===
Those in attendance at a conference convened to determine the modalities of German control over the Baltic states nevertheless defined the perimeter of the regions to the east of the Reich that the government aspired to control at the end of the conflict.

As editor of the information letter to the new Chancellor, Richard von Kühlmann provides a comprehensive overview of Germany's war aims. Although he favored indirect control over these regions, (Note: He thus supported the line taken by the resigning chancellor, Theobald von Bethmann Hollweg, a fervent advocate of placing independent states under strict economic supervision.) he reiterated the terms of the agreement with the military and mentioned the Reich's annexation of Lithuania and Courland.

At the conference, all those present supported the creation of a Mitteleuropa under German political, economic, and military tutelage, including the Baltic states and Finland. However, there were differing opinions on the specific form this inclusion should take. (Note: The question of the nature of the political ties between Lithuania, Courland and Livonia, on the one hand, and the Reich, on the other, remained unresolved.)

=== Irreconcilable views ===
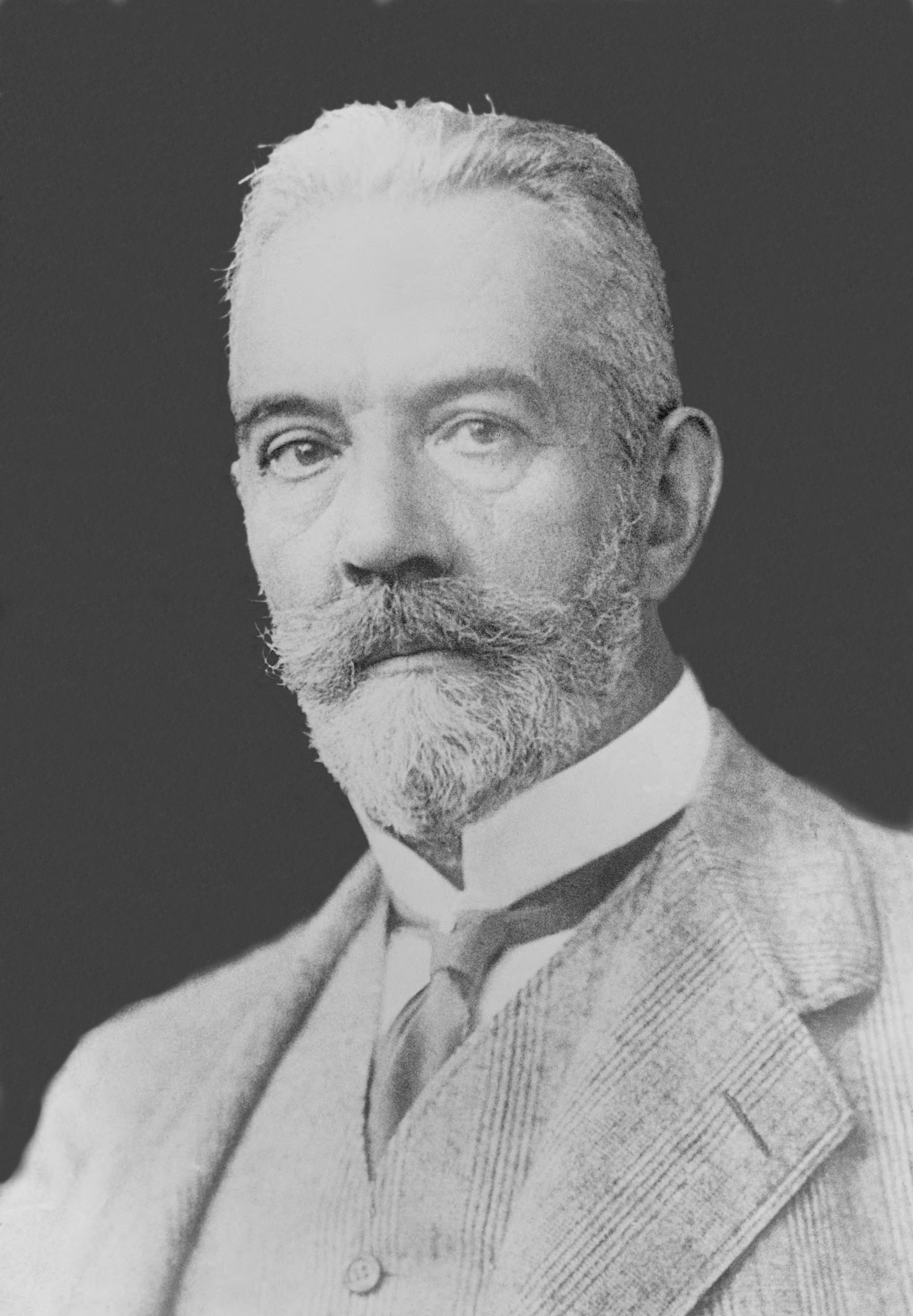
Theobald von Bethmann-Hollweg

Since Reich Chancellor Theobald von Bethmann-Hollweg agreed to the Kreuznach program on April 23, 1917, the Dioscuri has consistently reminded them of the binding nature of the terms drawn up on this occasion.

The two military men were not convinced of the effectiveness of establishing an indirect trusteeship over the territories destined to become part of Mitteleuropa, a vast area destined to be placed under strong Reich influence. They believed that the Reich would benefit from additional security and power through an enormous policy of annexations at the expense of Russia, which was then in the throes of decomposition.

In light of this ambitious expansionist agenda, Secretary of State Richard von Kühlmann proposed encouraging the populations of the Baltic and Polish territories on the road to independence while limiting its reality to the extreme through long-term political, economic, and military agreements. Those favoring a more flexible approach believed that a comprehensive program of annexations would only be feasible once the war had concluded. They also recognized the potential for the vanquished to seek retribution in the context of the estrangement of the Dual Monarchy, the Reich's only reliable ally.

== Issue ==
After the Bingen Conference, German politicians reached a definitive conclusion regarding two long-standing questions: the nature and extent of the Reich's control over the Baltic states and Finland. This issue has been under discussion since the Kreuznach conference on April 23.

=== Disguising the imperialist program ===
Consequently, after the conflict, the Reich was required to exert direct or indirect control over the Baltic states and Finland, which had been restored as independent states but were politically, militarily, and economically subject to Germany.

To reinforce this control, the establishment of independent states favorable to Germany was planned. A coordinated propaganda campaign involving the Reich government and the High Command's services was devised to facilitate this. In this context, the German authorities planned to rely on the consultative bodies set up since the conquest and on "freely elected" corporate committees, mainly comprising representatives of the German-Baltic populations, to integrate the Baltic countries into the German sphere of influence.

Concurrently, with the backing of the country's primary economic pressure groups, the German government sought to establish long-term trade relations with these newly independent states. The agreements reached recognized the Reich's and each of the new sovereign states' equal rights. However, this equality proved to be an illusion, given the significant disparity in economic development between the Reich and these new partners. The participants at this conference defined the policy of placing the newly independent Baltic States under economic trusteeship. German negotiators were to achieve recognition of the most-favored-nation clause within the framework of trade agreements theoretically concluded on an equal footing. This would allow the establishment and perpetuation of strong German economic trusteeship over states whose independence was then proving to be theoretical.

=== New states with limited sovereignty ===
The conference participants supported the establishment of independent states with strong ties to the Reich.

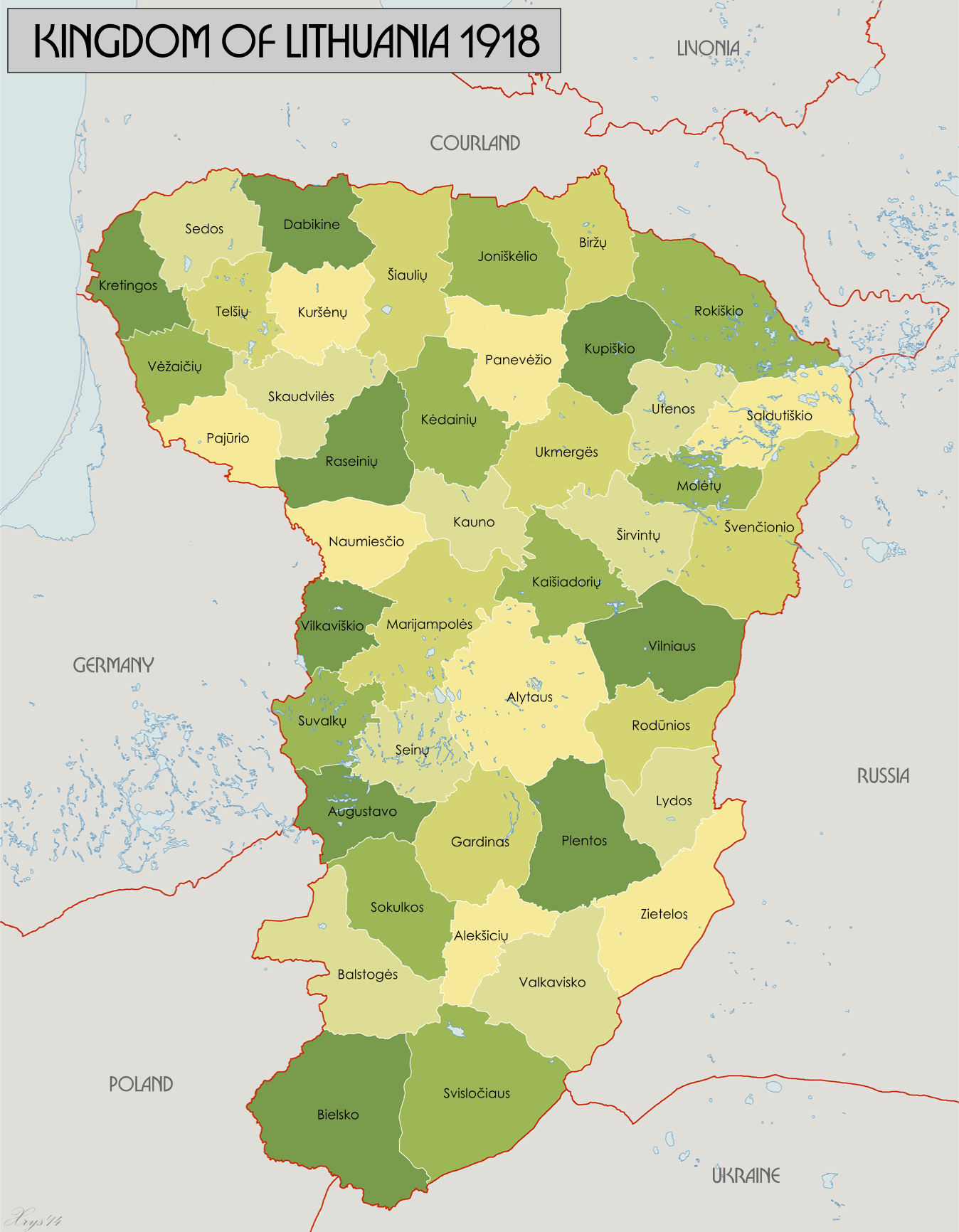
The Kingdom of Lithuania in 1918.

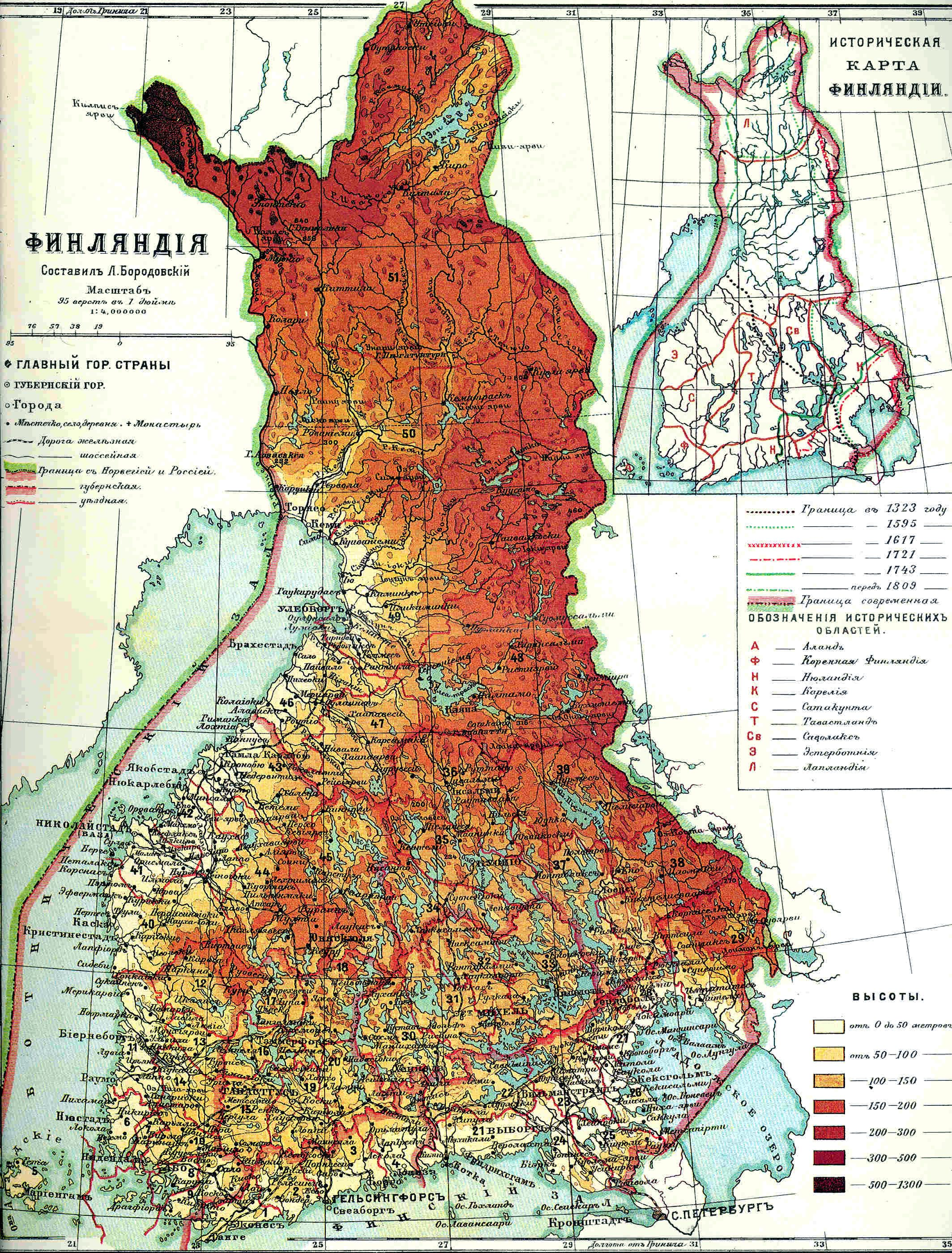
Grand Duchy of Finland in c. 1900

The establishment of this trusteeship was closely linked to an awareness on the part of German leaders of the long-term isolation of the Reich and its allies and the implementation of a trade "boycott" directed against the Central Powers, in the words of Georges-Henri Soutou. In light of these circumstances, German officials initiated measures to establish long-term conditions for German hegemony in Europe, intending to mitigate the impact of this "boycott". The Reich government deemed the establishment of an indirect trusteeship over the Baltic states and Finland a safer option. In this context, the Auswärtiges Amt encouraged separatist movements on Russian territory occupied by the Reich and its allies. According to government calculations, the governments of these new states would find themselves obliged to draw closer to the Reich to guarantee their new independence from Russia.

These multifaceted ties were to take the form of long-term political and economic agreements. The states placed under the Reich's tutelage were also to be open to German colonization. Plans were drawn up for establishing agrarian colonies designed to perpetuate the Reich's hold on these regions by relying on the agreement of the local populations. Implementing this settlement policy, which involved sending German colonists to the Baltic states, also proved to be a means of perpetuating the existence of states that would guarantee the Reich's political, military, economic, and commercial interests. This was achieved by organizing pressure groups to maintain political and economic ties between their homeland of origin and their country of settlement.

== See also ==
- Bingen am Rhein
- Wilhelm II
- Georg Michaelis
- Richard von Kühlmann
- Dioscuri (World War I)
- Paul von Hindenburg
- Erich Ludendorff
- Oberste Heeresleitung
- Germany's Aims in the First World War
- Crisis of July 1917

== Bibliography ==
- Bogdan, Henry (2014). Le Kaiser Guillaume II : dernier empereur d'Allemagne (in French). Paris: Éditions Tallandier. ISBN 979-10-210-0517-4.
- Fischer, Fritz (1970). Les Buts de guerre de l'Allemagne impériale (in French). Translated by Geneviève Migeon and Henri Thiès. Paris: Éditions de Trévise.
- Mommsen, Wolfgang J. (1968). "L'opinion allemande et la chute du gouvernement Bethmann-Hollweg". Revue d'histoire moderne et contemporaine (in French). Vol. 15. pp. 39–53. doi:10.3406/rhmc.1968.3328.
- Renouvin, Pierre (1962). La Crise européenne et la Première Guerre mondiale. Paris: Presses Universitaires de France.
- Soutou, Georges-Henri (1989). L'Or et le sang : les Buts de guerre économiques de la Première Guerre mondiale (in French). Paris: Fayard. ISBN 978-2213022154.
- Sukiennicki, Wiktor (1984). East Central Europe During World War I: From Foreign Domination to National Independence. Boulder: East European Monographs.
