= Kreuznach Conference (17–18 May 1917) =

Political and military conference of the Central Powers

Kreuznach Conference (May 17–18, 1917)
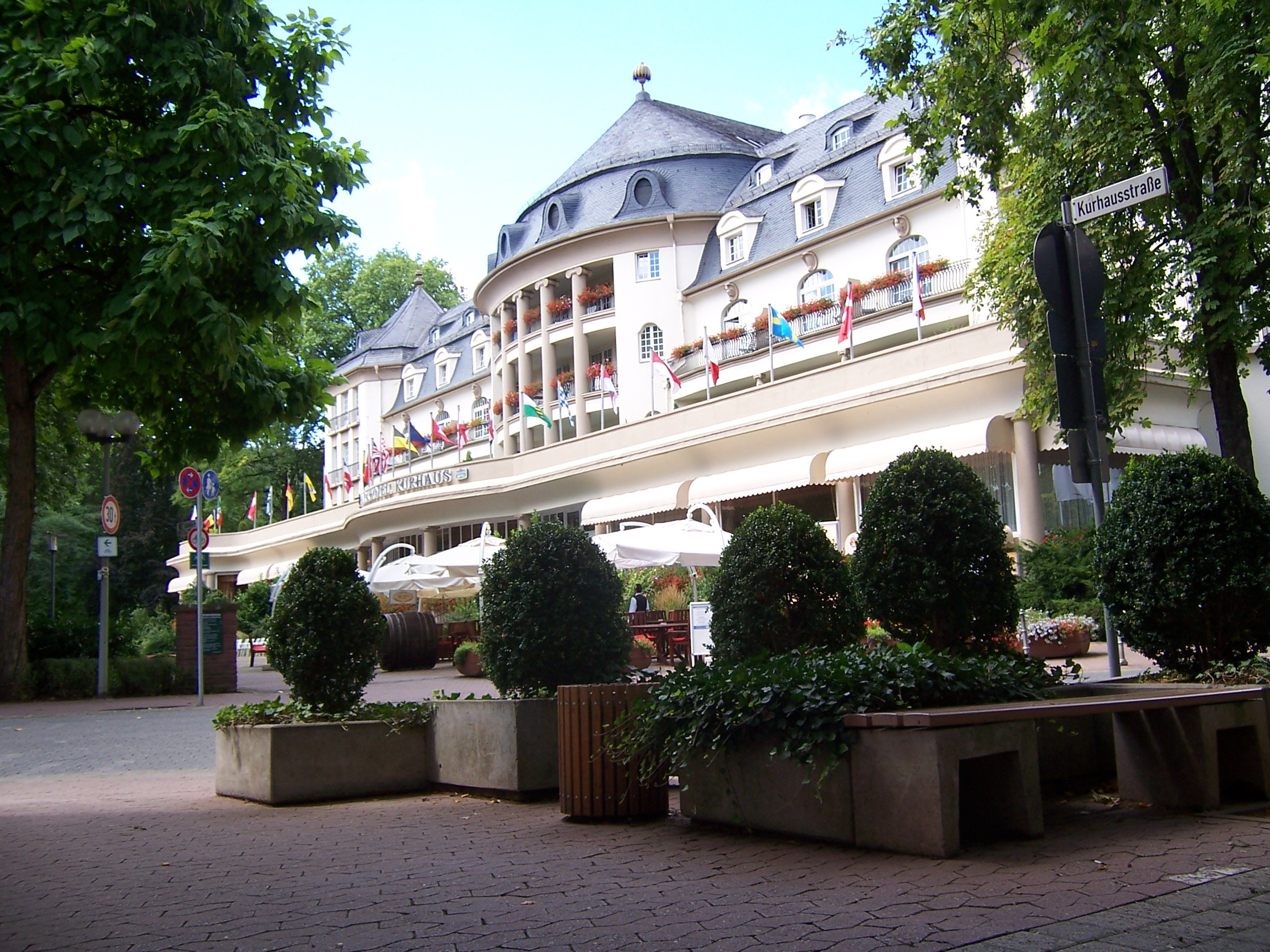
- The Parkhotel Kurhaus in Bad Kreuznach, headquarters of the German Army High Command from January 2, 1917, to March 8, 1918.
- Date: May 17-18, 1917
- Location: Bad Kreuznach, German Empire
- Type: Strategic meeting
- Participants: Wilhelm II; Charles I of Austria; Theobald von Bethmann Hollweg; Ottokar Czernin; Paul von Hindenburg; Erich Ludendorff; Franz Conrad von Hötzendorf
- Outcome: First negotiations for sharing the conquests of the Quadruple Alliance

The Kreuznach Conference of 17–18 May 1917 was a meeting of the political and military leaders of the Central Powers held in Bad Kreuznach, a town in the Prussian Rhineland that served as the seat of the German Army Supreme Command (OHL).

The conference took place in the spring of 1917 and was prepared with particular care by both partners. On the German side, preparations were carried out during the German Crown Council of 23 April 1917, while on the Austro-Hungarian side they took place during meetings of the Austro-Hungarian Crown Councils and in less formal discussions between representatives of the Austrian and Hungarian governments and the joint ministries. (Note: Within Austria-Hungary, two monarchies, each with its own institutions, coexisted, linked by common affairs and matters to be managed “by common agreement.” The former were placed under the responsibility of joint ministers accountable to the Emperor-King, while the latter were the subject of constant negotiations between representatives of the two states.)

The conference was intended to allow the German and Austro-Hungarian monarchs and their diplomatic representatives to ratify an agreement on the division of prospective territorial gains in Russia and the Balkans. In the days preceding the meeting, the Austro-Hungarian Minister of Foreign Affairs, Ottokar Czernin, prepared a memorandum outlining the severe weakening of the Dual Monarchy after three years of war, which was meant to serve as a negotiating instrument for the Austro-Hungarian delegation. At the same time, the German leadership expressed its determination to continue the war until a victory by the Central Powers, rejecting the peace initiatives advanced by its increasingly war-weary ally.

== Context ==
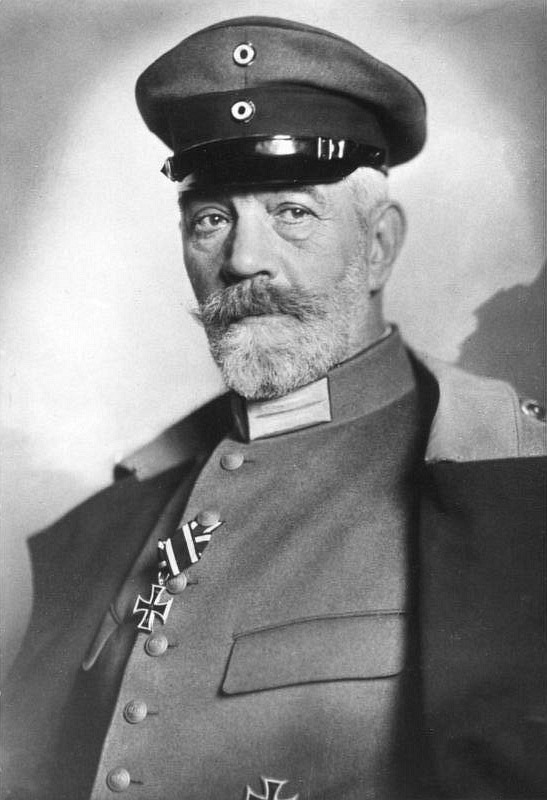
Theobald von Bethmann Hollweg (1917).

The end of 1916 and the beginning of 1917 represented a pivotal phase for the Central Powers in the conduct of the war. Military successes had allowed the Quadruple Alliance to occupy Serbia in 1915 and part of Romania in 1916. In addition, from March 1917 onward, Russia entered a prolonged revolutionary process that undermined the operational effectiveness of its armies, already weakened by widespread desertions. Despite these military and political developments, the Central Powers were unable to compel the Allied Powers to enter peace negotiations. In this context, Charles I, who succeeded his uncle Franz Joseph at the end of 1916, sought to end the Dual Monarchy’s participation in the conflict, taking into account its limited capacities in 1917.

=== The Quadruple Alliance and the February Revolution ===
The February 1917 Russian Revolution altered the strategic outlook of the war and prompted the belligerent states to reconsider, at least formally, their war aims. In response, Germany and its allies convened to evaluate the implications of the revolution for their conduct of the conflict. Meetings of ministers from the Central Powers were held in Vienna on 16 March and in Berlin on 26–27 March 1917, with the aim of redefining the conditions under which the Central Empires might negotiate an end to hostilities.

German expectations of a separate peace with the new Russian government soon diminished, as Russian leaders declared on 18 March 1917 their intention to continue the war against the Quadruple Alliance. In response, German decision-makers, advised by Ulrich von Brockdorff-Rantzau, then stationed in Bern, shifted their attention toward the Bolsheviks, who advocated immediate peace, as well as toward Russian political refugees in Switzerland, where many opponents of the war were based.

During the German–Austro-Hungarian meetings of March 1917, the military and right-wing nationalist factions expressed optimism regarding the political developments resulting from the February Revolution. In this context, they advocated for intensifying the war effort of the Dual Monarchy within the framework of the Quadruple Alliance. This approach was opposed by Chancellor Theobald von Bethmann Hollweg and his close associates, who supported a compromise peace at the beginning of 1917. In a speech to the Reichstag on 29 March 1917, Bethmann Hollweg publicly stated his intention to negotiate with the new Russian government for an “honorable peace for both parties,” while also seeking border adjustments favorable to the German Empire and its allies. Negotiations were subsequently initiated in Stockholm through indirect channels. However, these talks were lengthy and complex and ultimately failed, as German negotiators were constrained by the military’s preference for extensive territorial annexations in Russia.

Alongside the opening of German–Russian negotiations, German aspirations for a victory peace through intensified military action against the new Russian government came into conflict with the internal situation of the Dual Monarchy and the awareness of this situation among Austro-Hungarian leaders.

=== Dual monarchy in the face of the Reich ===
This awareness led members of the German government to adjust their stance toward their Austro-Hungarian counterparts.

The alliance agreements concluded from 1879 onward were designed to ensure equality between the German Empire and Austria-Hungary. However, the balance of power among the Central Powers and the growing exhaustion of the Dual Monarchy during the war contributed to an increasing dominance of Germany. As a result, from the beginning of 1917, Austro-Hungarian leaders expressed reservations about the plans proposed by their German allies for their country. (Note: The Reich sought to subject the Dual Monarchy to increased vassalization as part of the realization of a Mitteleuropa in which the Reich would play a predominant role.)

On 3 April 1917 in Bad Kreuznach, Charles I proposed to German Emperor Wilhelm II that the Dual Monarchy cede its Silesian territories in exchange for the return of Alsace-Lorraine to France. The proposal was rejected by German leaders, including the German Emperor.

On 13 April 1917, a few days before the first Kreuznach Conference, Ottokar Czernin, the new Austro-Hungarian Minister of Foreign Affairs, presented Emperor Charles I with a memorandum titled “Austrian military power in the process of disintegration.” Dated the previous day, the memorandum, officially addressed to the Emperor-King but in practice intended for the German interlocutors of the Austro-Hungarian political leadership, assessed that the Dual Monarchy was no longer in a position to continue the conflict in the spring of 1917. Charles I immediately communicated the document to Wilhelm II as a means of pressure on the German government, while hoping that it would serve as the basis for negotiations aimed at peace talks with the Allies. Czernin also sent a copy to Matthias Erzberger, who was in Vienna on a mission for the new German Chancellor, Georg Michaelis. After reviewing the memorandum, Erich Ludendorff and Paul von Hindenburg expressed reservations and opposed the Austro-Hungarian aims, urging the minister to prioritize the continuation of the conflict rather than the satisfaction of domestic demands. Charles I and Czernin, convinced that they had secured a means of pressure on the German government, ultimately succeeded only in irritating their civilian and military counterparts in the German leadership. At this stage of the war, the German government and supreme command had not abandoned the goal of resolving the conflict through military victory or pursuing the political and economic expansion that such a victory would make possible.

The memorandum and the German government’s response highlighted the limited practical equality between the Central Powers, as the German Empire was unwilling to accept the demands of its Austro-Hungarian ally. Consequently, Wilhelm II, with the support of his civilian and military advisers, set the political and economic conditions under which the Quadruple Alliance would be willing to end hostilities.

== Preparations ==
The May conference, which was the first meeting between the German monarch and his Austro-Hungarian counterpart, was prepared during earlier meetings held on 16 March in Vienna and on 23 April 1917 in Kreuznach. The Vienna meeting brought together German Chancellor Theobald von Bethmann Hollweg and Austro-Hungarian Foreign Minister Ottokar Czernin. At the April meeting, Emperor Wilhelm II convened the main German political and military leaders, including the Chancellor; Oskar von der Lancken, head of the political section of the General Government of Brussels; the military leaders Paul von Hindenburg and Erich Ludendorff; and Henning von Holtzendorff, Commander-in-Chief of the Imperial German Navy. (Note: Several other preparatory meetings were held during this period, notably on 17 April, but historiography has retained only the conference of 23 April 1917.)

=== Preparatory meetings ===
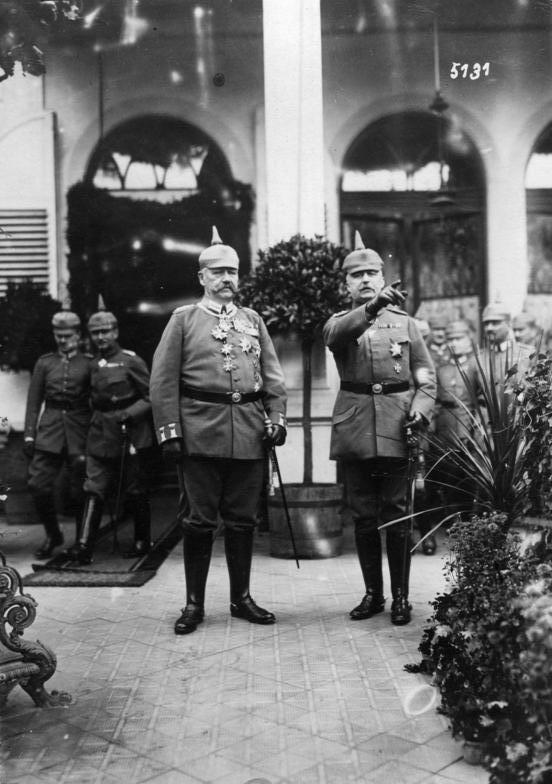
Hindenburg and Ludendorff at headquarters in Kreuznach (1917)

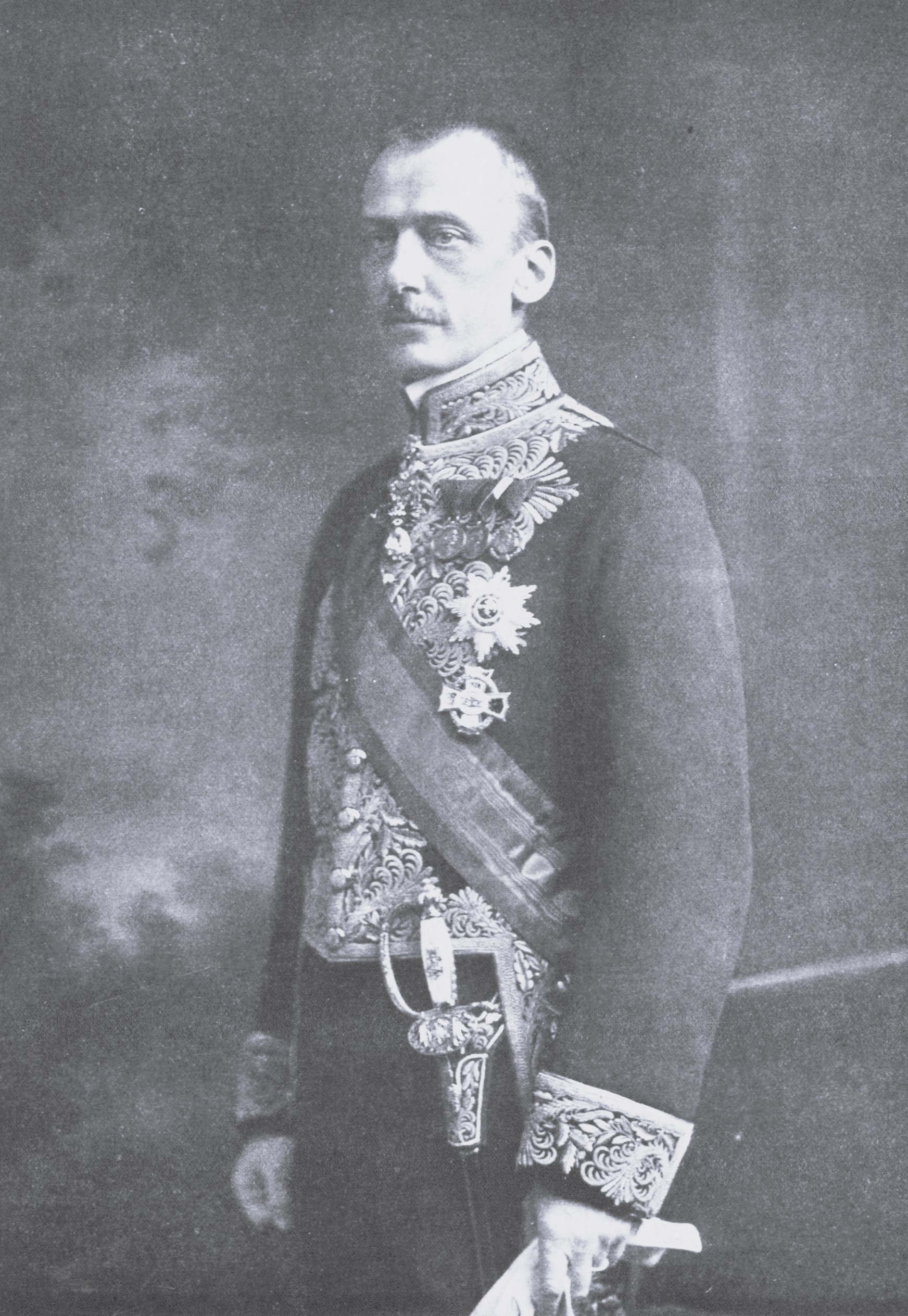
Ottokar Czernin (1918)

At the conference of 23 April 1917, the German military leaders Paul von Hindenburg and Erich Ludendorff, as well as the Austro-Hungarian military leader Conrad von Hötzendorf, were present. In accordance with the imperial order of 20 April, German Chancellor Theobald von Bethmann Hollweg attended the meeting, accompanied by Foreign Minister Arthur Zimmermann. Oskar von der Lancken, head of the political section of the General Government of Brussels, was also present.

During the conference, the issue of the parallel diplomacy pursued by Charles I to withdraw Austria-Hungary from the war was discussed. The discussion occurred in a context of mutual mistrust between German and Austro-Hungarian representatives. Although Charles I informed the German leadership, Foreign Minister Ottokar Czernin did not fully disclose the progress of negotiations to the German delegation.

In parallel, Austro-Hungarian leaders held repeated preparatory meetings to define their position in the emerging negotiations. On 6 May, a joint council of ministers chaired by Czernin established the Dual Monarchy’s negotiating stance.

=== Preliminary negotiations ===
The exchanges between German and Austro-Hungarian leaders in the period leading up to the May conference became increasingly tense, particularly between German Chancellor Theobald von Bethmann Hollweg and Austro-Hungarian Foreign Minister Ottokar Czernin. The question of the war aims pursued by Germany and those pursued by its allies became a significant point of contention. During these preliminary talks, Austro-Hungarian representatives, aware of the Dual Monarchy’s exhaustion, openly expressed their desire to conclude a compromise peace with the Allies as soon as possible.

The first negotiations concerning the division of the Central Powers’ expected territorial gains were initiated in Berlin. According to the minutes of these meetings, the territorial, political, and economic benefits acquired after the conflict by Germany and its allies were to be proportional to the resources each had deployed, thereby strengthening Germany’s position in Europe and globally, including relative to its allies. As early as 3 April 1917, the German Army Supreme Command supported holding a conference bringing together representatives of Germany and Austria-Hungary to clarify their respective war aims. (Note: In Poland and in the Balkans, each of the two allies aspired to exercise decisive influence, thus exacerbating rivalries between the Reich and the Dual Monarchy.)

The conferences allowed Germany and its allies to clarify the war aims of the two main partners of the Quadruple Alliance at a time when the United States had entered the conflict. Germany envisaged the annexation of Courland and Lithuania, both occupied by the Central Powers, (Note: Riga would then mark the border between Russia and the Reich.) and sought to establish strong control over Poland, expanded with Austro-Hungarian Galicia. Austria-Hungary would be compensated for the loss of its Polish and Ukrainian territories through the annexation of Serbia and most of Romania, to be shared with Germany. In the west, Germany sought lasting control over the Flemish coast and the Longwy mining basin, in exchange for border adjustments in southern Alsace.

In parallel with the talks among members of the Quadruple Alliance, the Conference of Saint-Jean-de-Maurienne, held among the Allied powers, reaffirmed their determination not to negotiate separately with any member of the Quadruple Alliance.

== Participants ==
The conference brought together the main civilian and military representatives of the two principal members of the Quadruple Alliance, Germany and Austria-Hungary, at the Parkhotel Kurhaus in Bad Kreuznach.

=== Representatives of the Reich ===
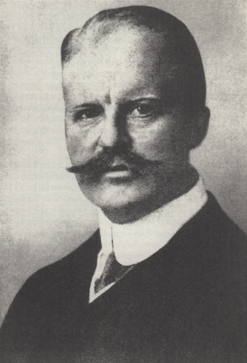
Arthur Zimmermann, then State Secretary for Foreign Affairs of the Reich.

The German imperial delegation was led by Emperor Wilhelm II. It included the Reich Chancellor, Theobald von Bethmann Hollweg, and the Secretary of State for Foreign Affairs, Arthur Zimmermann. The head of the political section of the General Government of Brussels, Oskar von der Lancken, was also present at the conference.

The principal military leaders of the Reich, Paul von Hindenburg and Erich Ludendorff, also attended the meeting. Their presence symbolized the growing influence of the military on the political, diplomatic, and economic life of the Second Reich, which had been at war for more than two years. (Note: From the middle of 1916, the Reich lived under a de facto military dictatorship exercised by the high command and embodied by the Dioscuri.)

=== Representatives of the dual monarchy ===
The Austro-Hungarian delegation was led by Emperor Charles I. It was composed of the new Minister of Foreign Affairs of the Dual Monarchy, Ottokar Czernin, and the Austro-Hungarian Chief of the General Staff, Franz Conrad von Hötzendorf. On this occasion, they were assisted by their closest collaborators.

== Negotiations ==
The exchanges between Germany and its principal ally concerned the war aims pursued by the two states. The debate rapidly evolved into a confrontation between Germany and the Dual Monarchy over the questions of peace and the nature of the control that each member of the coalition would exercise over the territories it occupied or sought to acquire, either in the short term or at the conclusion of peace treaties. In this context, the German and Austro-Hungarian negotiators entered the conference with specific, and often antagonistic, objectives.

=== War or peace? ===
Supported by advisors who were increasingly aware of the Dual Monarchy’s limited capacity to continue the war, Emperor Charles I sought to assert Austro-Hungarian aspirations for peace in negotiations with Germany.

Drawing on the conclusions of Czernin’s report, “Austrian military power in the process of disintegration,” Charles sought to convey to Germany his intention to preserve the empire. The report represented a new phase in the tensions between Austria-Hungary and Germany, with Germany pursuing territorial expansion through annexations secured by military victory, while Austria-Hungary aimed to withdraw from the conflict. In this context, German leaders opposed Austro-Hungarian demands, which Chancellor Bethmann Hollweg described as a “cheap peace.”

The Austro-Hungarian proposals were quickly dismissed by the German representatives and received little attention, reflecting the increasingly formal nature of equality between Germany and the Dual Monarchy within their alliance.

=== War aims ===
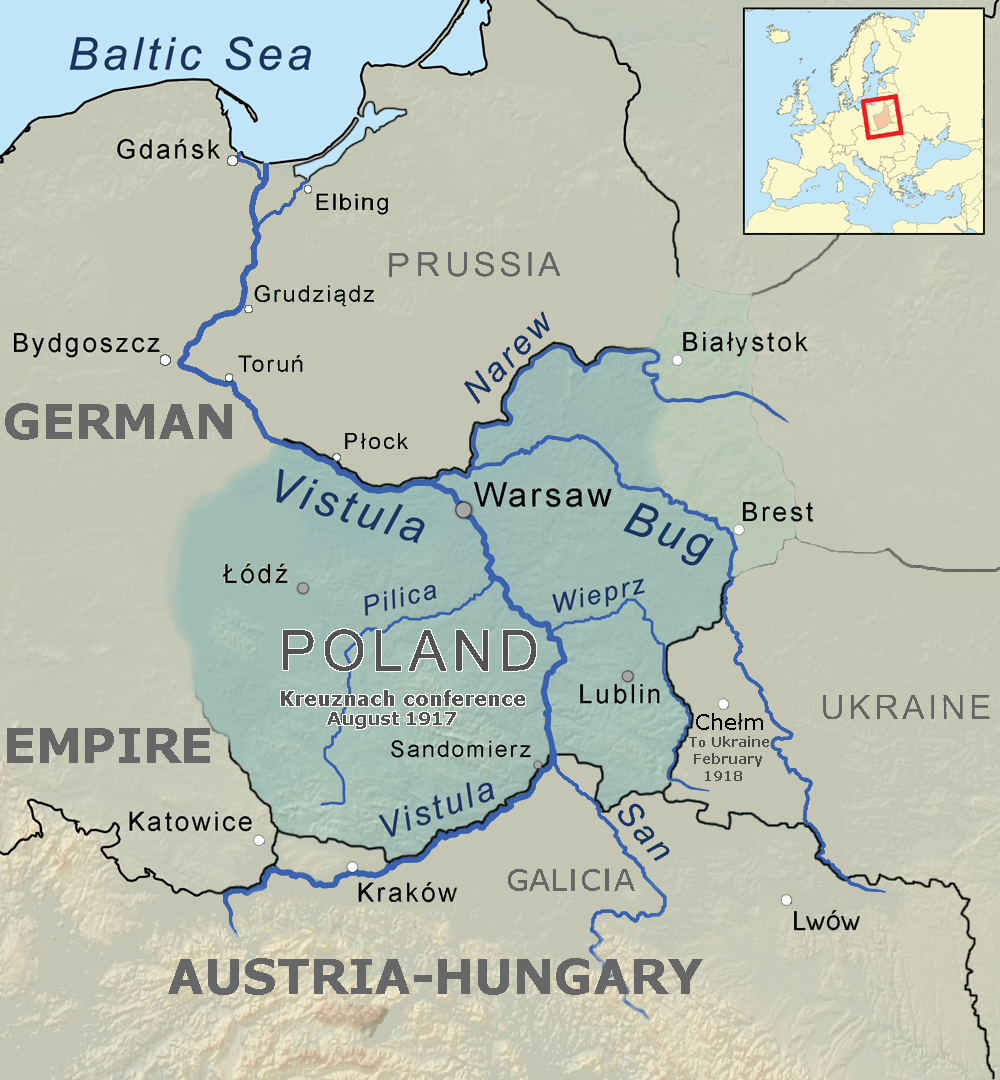
The draft of the Kingdom of Poland in February 1918, after the first Kreuznach Conference and the cession of Chełm to Ukraine.

The April conference, which brought together the principal German leaders, enabled the German military authorities and the Chancellor to clarify their war aims and to attempt to impose them, at least in part, on the Dual Monarchy, which was increasingly reluctant to continue the conflict. As a result, the question of war aims was discussed extensively during the talks of 17–18 May. These aims had been defined in a note from Wilhelm II to Foreign Minister Arthur Zimmermann dated 13 May, which reiterated conclusions formulated in April and set out conditions that could only be secured through victory. These included the creation of a large economic area under German control, (Note: This vast area, centered on the Balkans, was to include Antwerp to the west, Tallinn to the north, Rostov-on-Don to the east, and Baghdad and Suez to the south.) dominance of the Mediterranean, the return of German colonies with the addition of the Belgian and French Congos, and extensive annexations in Europe.

The occupied regions in Eastern Europe were intended to be divided between Germany and Austria-Hungary. German leaders proposed the direct annexation of Courland and Lithuania, and sought to place the Kingdom of Poland, expanded by Austro-Hungarian Galicia, under German tutelage. In the west, Belgium was to be politically and economically subordinated to Germany, with long-term occupation of the Flemish coast while formally maintaining Belgian independence. France was to receive territorial compensations in southern Alsace in exchange for the Longwy–Briey mining basin. Germany also sought the right for its companies to exploit the mineral resources of Serbian territories annexed to Bulgaria.

Austria-Hungary was to be compensated for the loss of Galicia through territorial annexations in Serbia and Romania. Austro-Hungarian leaders indicated they were willing to relinquish their influence in Poland in favor of Germany in exchange for unrestricted control over the regions they intended to annex in the Balkans. This division of occupied zones was accepted by the German negotiators, who quickly confirmed Austria-Hungary’s exclusive influence in Serbia, Albania, and Montenegro. Despite these concessions, Germany sought to consolidate its position in the Balkans through control of the region’s ports, including Thessaloniki, Vlorë, and Constanța.

Faced with these demands, the Austro-Hungarian delegation sought to assert the war aims of the Dual Monarchy, which was increasingly unable to sustain the prolonged conflict. However, the Austro-Hungarians did not abandon ambitions for political and economic expansion in the Balkans and in Poland. In exchange for increased German control in Poland and the Baltic states, Austria-Hungary proposed establishing its own influence over the Balkans, seeking political and economic advantages in Romania comparable to those pursued by Germany in Poland. (Note: The Austro-Hungarians were then prepared to renounce annexing the kingdom, which was at that time defeated and partially occupied.)

=== Economic stakes ===
Moreover, the two partners of the Dual Alliance, not content with sharing the conquests made possible by military operations conducted separately or jointly, defined the economic clauses of a hypothetical victorious exit from the conflict and the nature of the economic ties intended to bind them.

A victorious Germany would thus impose on the defeated Allies the payment of enormous war indemnities. These were intended to take the form of deliveries of raw materials or manufactured goods, placing these countries under the commercial dependence of the Reich, or of transfers of public or private debts for the benefit of the Reich.

Germany sought not only to impose indemnities on defeated adversaries but also to establish closer economic ties with the Dual Monarchy through a customs union. The technical negotiations on this issue proceeded gradually between the two partners. In response to the German proposal, Austro-Hungarian negotiators expressed a preference for a specific trade agreement with Germany, which would include preferential customs duties defined on a case-by-case basis.

Furthermore, the interests of major German companies were taken into account. In all regions occupied or intended to be controlled by Germany, German banks and industrial and commercial firms sought to guarantee German influence through strict control of the economies of the occupied countries. Germany therefore intended, with the support of the Dual Monarchy, to exclude members of the Entente from the International Danube Commission. In Romania, German banks demanded the retrocession of Romanian oil fields through majority shareholdings and sought to obtain German control over production.

== Outcome ==
The results of the first conference are known primarily through minutes published after the end of hostilities. Germany’s war aims were reaffirmed, consistent with those pursued by the German Army Supreme Command and with objectives set out in September 1914 and in the OHL memorandum of 23 December 1916. A final note, approved by the two principal partners of the Quadruple Alliance, formalized the conclusions of the discussions. Although drafted by German diplomats, the note was submitted to Emperor-King Charles for approval, which served as definitive ratification.

=== Territorial reconfigurations ===
The final note provided for the German annexation of Courland, Lithuania, several Polish localities near the German–Russian border, the Longwy–Briey mining basin, a strip of territory in Alsace along the French border, and Luxembourg. Bruges and Liège were also designated for direct annexation by Germany. In addition to these annexed regions, several countries or geographic areas and communication routes were to fall under German political or economic tutelage, including Poland and the Cernavodă–Constanța railway line.

Austria-Hungary was promised annexations in Wallachia, Serbia, and the entirety of Montenegro, along with control over Albania. While these annexations appeared to strengthen Austro-Hungarian power, they effectively represented political tutelage over neighboring territories. The benefits of these annexations were limited by the strong economic influence Germany sought to exert in the region through majority German shareholdings in transport, mining, and industry in countries under Austro-Hungarian political control.

The German negotiators also addressed colonial issues. Germany sought the return of colonies occupied since the beginning of the war and requested additional territories. As part of its global strategy, Germany aimed to secure naval bases, including the Dakar region from France and the Azores, which were considered strategic points between Dakar and Germany.

Some German military officers regarded the conclusions of these conferences as demonstrating the limited value of the meetings, since they appeared to reaffirm the program outlined in September 1914 by the German Chancellor, while also confirming part of Austria-Hungary’s war aims.

=== War indemnities and economic expansion ===
With the permanence of the territories conquered by the Central Powers recognized, the minutes of the meeting also defined the financial conditions of a victory by Germany and its allies. In this area, the minutes reflected the terms of the note addressed by the German Emperor to his Secretary of State for Foreign Affairs.

Wilhelm II proposed demanding war indemnities of a substantial amount. According to Czernin, the proposed indemnities were disproportionate to the ability of the Quadruple Alliance to obtain them. The German Emperor planned to demand, as war indemnities, 30 billion dollars from the United States, 40 billion francs from France, 10 billion lire from Italy, and 2 billion gold marks from China, Japan, Brazil, Bolivia, and Portugal.

These sums were to be paid largely in kind, primarily through mining and agricultural products. In addition, claims owed by France and the United Kingdom would be transferred to Germany, thereby shifting the financial influence of those adversaries to the German Empire.

=== Persistence of Austro-German rivalries ===
Despite an agreement not to initiate hasty negotiations, the German and Austro-Hungarian negotiators concluded the conference with the same disagreements that had existed at the outset. However, for political reasons, the German government appeared willing to make numerous concessions in drafting economic agreements with the Dual Monarchy.

On 18 June 1917, belatedly, the Austro-Hungarian imperial and royal government officially accepted the terms of the final note at the conclusion of a Crown Council. (Note: During these more or less formal meetings, the Austrian and Hungarian prime ministers were associated with the joint ministers to make decisions affecting the Dual Monarchy as a whole.) On this occasion, the leaders of the Dual Monarchy communicated to their German interlocutors the main Austro-Hungarian reservations regarding the distribution of conquests between the Reich and its allies. These reservations concerned the division of the respective spheres of political influence of the Reich and the Dual Monarchy within territories conquered by the armies of the Quadruple Alliance, the distribution of the agricultural, mining, and industrial wealth of these territories, and the modalities of control over communication networks.

Despite the drafting of the final note and its acceptance by Austria-Hungary, Austro-German rivalries persisted in Poland, Romania, and the Balkans. Economic and commercial negotiations were scheduled to begin between Germany and Austria-Hungary to determine the terms of a customs union between the two principal members of the Quadruple Alliance. Czernin established certain conditions for the opening of these negotiations, but the continuation of German war aims undermined the significance of these prerequisites.

Despite ceding certain zones of influence to Austria-Hungary, Germany pursued economic initiatives in these regions that effectively brought them into its sphere. This was illustrated by the gradual takeover of the Romanian economy through shareholdings in Romanian companies, control of communication routes and oil export pipelines, the drafting of a new constitution, and the establishment of a legal framework modeled on that of Germany, thereby creating conditions for integration into a German-dominated Mitteleuropa.

== See also ==
- Bad Kreuznach
- Oberste Heeresleitung
- History of Austria-Hungary during World War I
- History of Montenegro#World War I
- Kingdom of Poland (1917–1918)
- Wilhelm II
- Charles I of Austria
- Theobald von Bethmann Hollweg
- Ottokar Czernin
- War aims of the First World War
- Germany's Aims in the First World War
- Mitteleuropa

== Bibliography ==
- Bled, Jean-Paul (2014). L'agonie d'une monarchie : Autriche-Hongrie 1914-1920 [The agony of a monarchy: Austria-Hungary 1914-1920] (in French). Paris: Taillandier. ISBN 979-10-210-0440-5.
- Fischer, Fritz (1970). Les Buts de guerre de l'Allemagne impériale [The War Aims of Imperial Germany] (in French). Paris: Éditions de Trévise.
- Lacroix-Riz, Annie (1996). Le Vatican, l'Europe et le Reich : De la Première Guerre mondiale à la guerre froide [The Vatican, Europe, and the Reich: From World War I to the Cold War]. Références Histoire (in French). Paris: Armand Colin. ISBN 2-200-21641-6.
- Renouvin, Pierre (1934). La Crise européenne et la Première Guerre mondiale [The European Crisis and World War I]. Peuples et civilisations (in French). Paris: Presses universitaires de France.
- Schiavon, Max (2011). L'Autriche-Hongrie dans la Première Guerre mondiale : La fin d'un empire [Austria-Hungary in World War I: The End of an Empire]. Les Nations dans la Grande Guerre (in French). Paris: Éditions SOTECA. ISBN 978-2-916385-59-4.
- Soutou, Georges-Henri (1989). L'Or et le sang : Les Buts de guerre économiques de la Première Guerre mondiale [Gold and Blood: The Economic War Goals of World War I] (in French). Paris: Fayard. ISBN 2213022151.
