= Berlin Conference (August 14, 1917) =

German-Austro-Hungarian diplomatic meeting

Berlin Conference (August 14, 1917) Conférence de Berlin (14 août 1917)
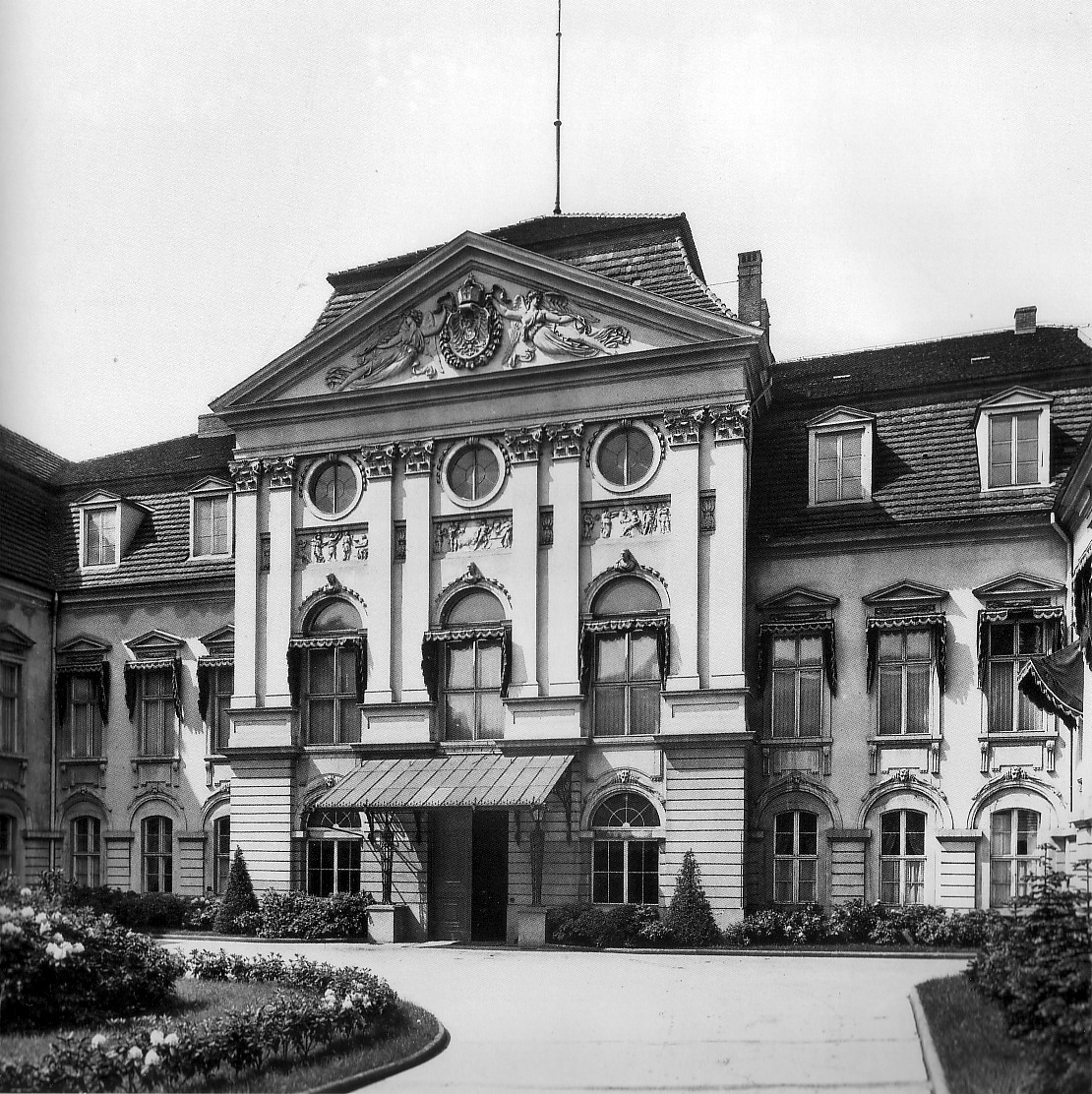
- The Reich Chancellery in 1910.
- Genre: Strategy meeting
- Date: 14 August 1917
- Location: Berlin
- Country: German Empire
- Participants: Georg Michaelis; Richard von Kühlmann; Ottokar Czernin; Prince Gottfried von Hohenlohe-Schillingsfürst

The Berlin Conference of August 14, 1917, was a German–Austro-Hungarian diplomatic meeting to define the policy of the Central Powers following the publication of the Papal Note of August 1, 1917. Since April of the previous year, the Reich (Note: Between the proclamation of the German Empire in 1871 and its dissolution in 1945, the official name of the German state was Deutsches Reich, subsequently referred to by the legal term Reich.) government members sought to impose unrealistic war aims and to require their Austro-Hungarian counterparts, who were governing a monarchy drained by the prolonged conflict, to share the European conquests of the Central Powers. The objective was to bring the dual monarchy under strict German control.

== Context ==
=== Divisions ratified in Bad Kreuznach ===
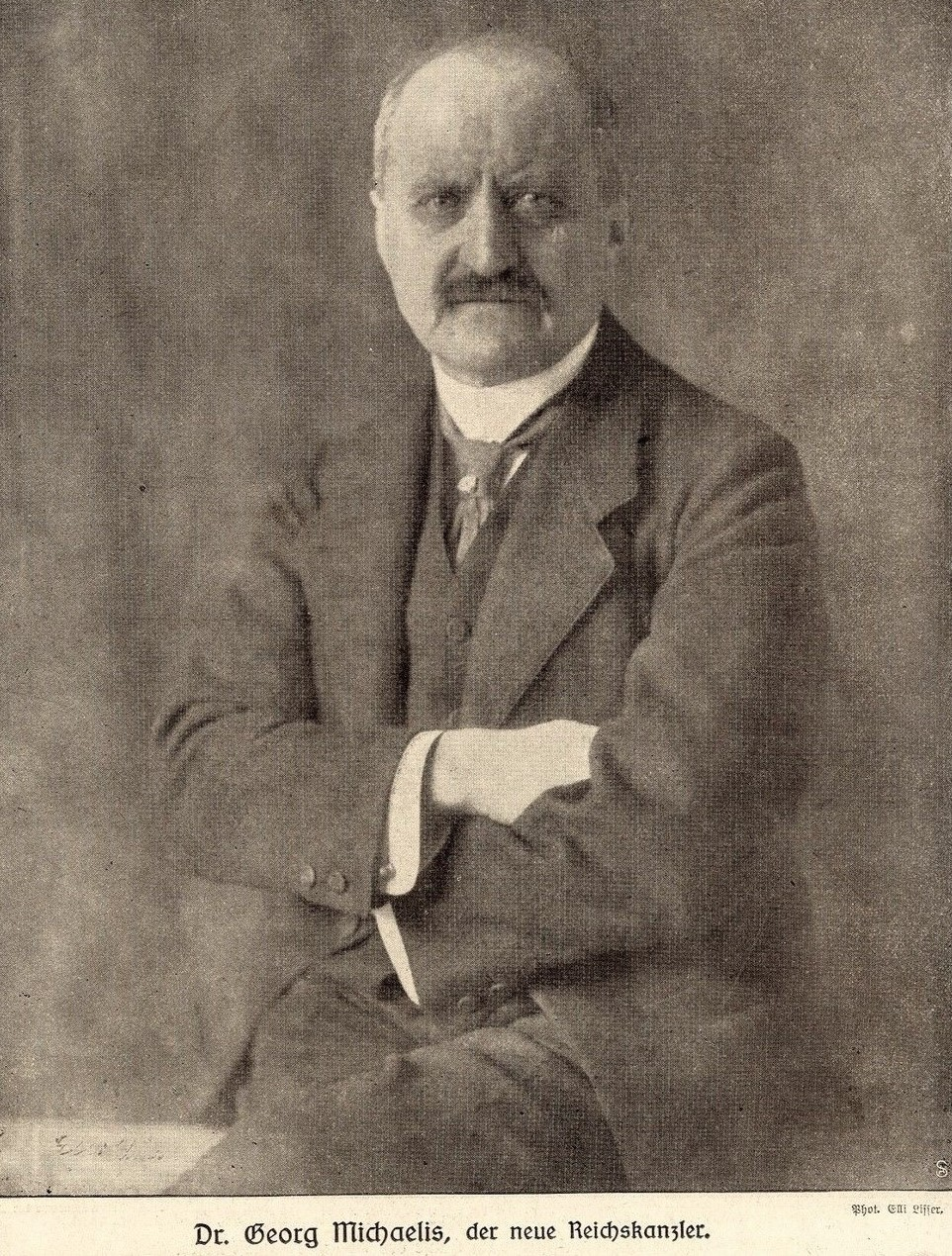
Georg Michaelis, pictured here in 1917, uses the Kreuznach Protocol of April 23, 1917 to define his policy.

Since the April 23, 1917 conference, Paul von Hindenburg and Erich Ludendorff (Note: These two soldiers appear inseparable, like the Dioscuri of Roman mythology.) had been pressuring the Chancellor to enact the program of war goals established at that meeting. During their initial meeting with the new Chancellor, Georg Michaelis, on August 9, Paul von Hindenburg and Erich Ludendorff revealed this text and, after a detailed presentation, were able to persuade him to endorse the annexation plan established the previous April.

A few weeks prior, Ottokar Czernin accepted the terms of the final note outlining the conclusions of the German-Austro-Hungarian talks from May 18, 1917. Nevertheless, the German leaders persistently eliminated the content of the agreement. Central and Eastern Europe were divided into German and Austro-Hungarian zones of influence. This division revealed the balance of power between the two allies, with the Germans attempting to take the place of the Austro-Hungarians. At Kreuznach, Albania, Montenegro, most of Serbia, and Wallachia were destined to join the Austro-Hungarian sphere of influence; however, this devolution concealed the powerful economic influence that the Reich kept for itself in the regions slated to become the dual monarchy's domain.

The German negotiators claimed Poland for the Reich, promising to exercise strict political, economic, and military control over it, despite its formal independence. Later, they put it under the control of Archduke Charles Stephen of Austria, cousin of Charles I of Austria. Additionally, they took control of some strategic railways in Romania and the Austro-Hungarian Balkans.

=== A deceptive change of policy ===
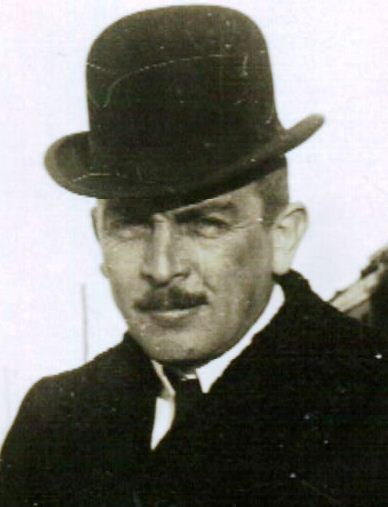
Richard von Kühlmann, Secretary of State for Foreign Affairs, wanted to establish indirect German tutelage in Europe.

At the same time, the High Command's removal of Theobald von Bethmann-Hollweg prompted a shift in Germany's policy during the conflict within the Reich.

Two trends emerged in the Reich Cabinet: On one hand, there were those who favored extensive annexations in Belgium, Poland, and the Baltic states, centered around the Dioscuri. On the other hand, there were those who grouped around Richard von Kühlmann and advocated for establishing indirect military, political, economic and commercial trusteeship. The trusteeship would be guaranteed by long-term bilateral agreements.

However, while there were differing views on the extent of German control over the territories, all German leaders agreed on the goal of establishing the Reich as the dominant economic power in Europe. This consensus included support for a broad economic bloc led by the Reich, whether through annexation or indirect trusteeship.

Finally, relations between Germany and Austria-Hungary experienced considerable strain subsequent to the departure of Theobald von Bethmann-Hollweg, taking on a markedly more aggressive tone. Austro-Hungarian attempts to rebuild relations with France were not overlooked by the Germans, who intensified their efforts to coerce their ally. On July 13, 1917, the Dioscuri conveyed a threat to the Austro-Hungarian ambassador in Berlin of a potential German invasion of the dual monarchy if efforts to establish communication with the French proved successful.

=== Austro-Hungarian exhaustion ===
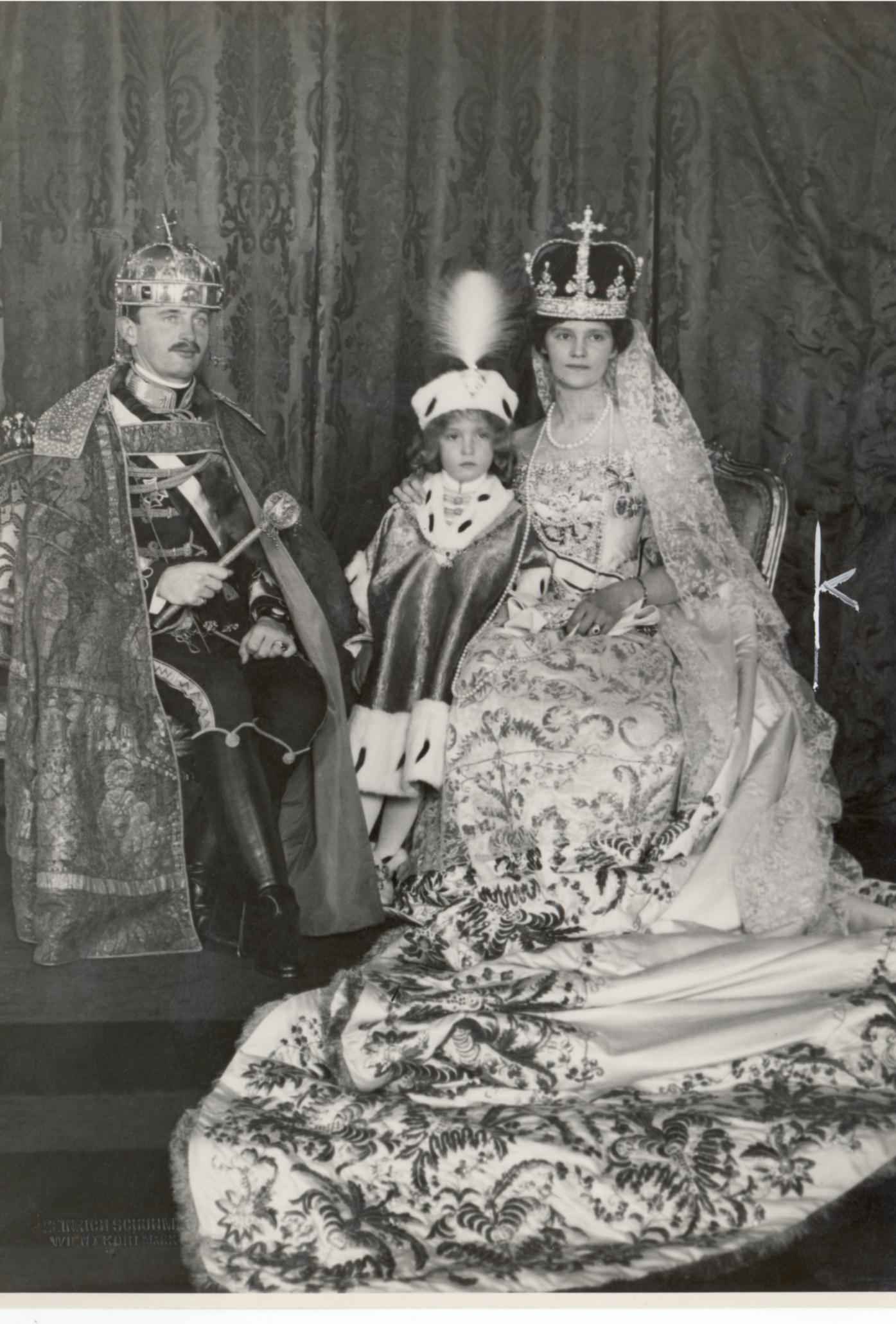
Emperor Charles I, left, tries to pull his empire out of the conflict by relying on the family of his wife Zita, right.

The prolonged conflict within the dual monarchy caused a severe domestic crisis, leading to a sense of "panic" among the Austro-Hungarian rulers. This urgency prompted them to increase concessions, hoping to rescue their country from the conflict.

The new monarch, Charles I, attempted to depart from the policies of his predecessor, Franz Joseph. He secured the resignation or departure of his predecessor's top aides and replaced them with individuals who shared his viewpoints. However, he did not provide assistance to them in their interactions with the Austrian and Hungarian legislative bodies.

He engaged in a backchannel diplomatic effort, bolstered by the support of Empress Zita's family, particularly her siblings and cousins; nevertheless, these endeavors were unsuccessful because of the emperor's indecisive and hesitant policy, which remained undecided and uncommitted, according to a letter from Ottokar Czernin to István Tisza, a previous Hungarian prime minister.

In conjunction with these efforts, on April 13, 1917, Ottokar Czernin, the co-Minister of Foreign Affairs, submitted to the recently crowned Emperor Charles an evaluation regarding the weakened economic and military state of the Danube monarchy in his document titled "Austrian military power in the process of disintegration"; the Germans received this report in the ensuing days. The report presents a grim outlook on the current state of the dual monarchy's military and socio-economic condition. It indicates that there has been no progress in the military situation, and the food crisis has only escalated with time. Moreover, Emperor-King Charles has been unable to provide a resolution that could pull the dual monarchy out of conflict.

Faced with a troubling situation, the Germans intensified their efforts to prolong the conflict with their primary partner. They dispatched unofficial missions, headed by Matthias Erzberger, and provided financial backing for Austrian and Hungarian political parties in favor of maintaining the alliance with the Reich. This political maneuvering was accompanied by more direct pressure on Austro-Hungarian leadership. German army strategists had devised a plan to invade the Austro-Hungarian Empire, and German officials had made threats to carry it out in front of their interlocutors several times from July 13 to August 14, 1917.

== Participants ==
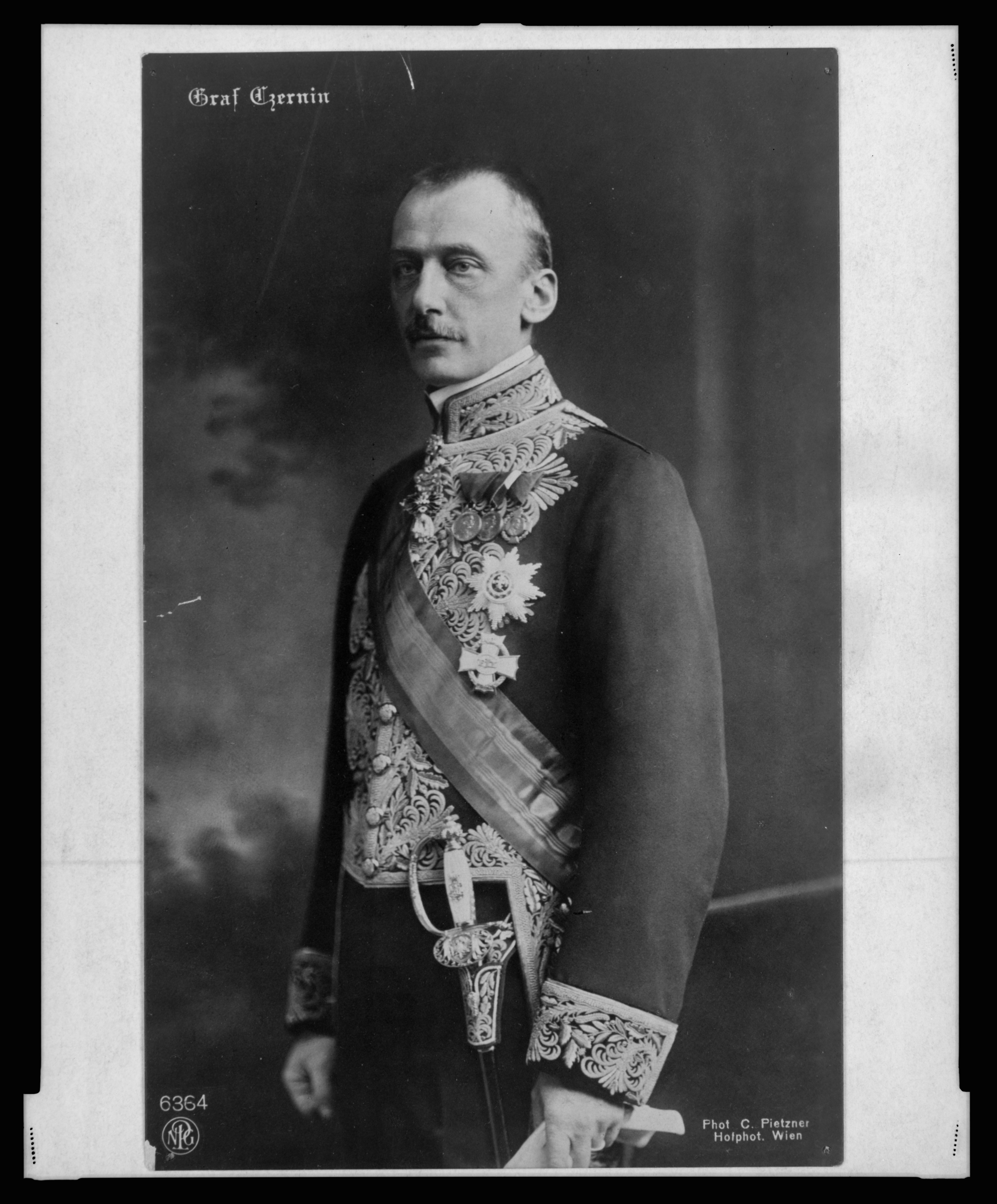
Ottokar Czernin, Austro-Hungarian Foreign Minister.

The conference took place in the Reich Chancellery, chaired by Chancellor Georg Michaelis. He was assisted by Vice-Chancellor Karl Helfferich and the new State Secretary for Foreign Affairs, Richard von Kühlmann, an experienced diplomat.

The Austro-Hungarian Foreign Minister, Ottokar Czernin, represented the dual monarchy in attendance at the conference. He was assisted by Alexander Hoyos, (Note: Alexander Hoyos was sent to Berlin on July 5, 1914 to sound out the Reich government on how to deal with Serbia in the wake of the Sarajevo bombing.) his chief of staff, and Gottfried von Hohenlohe, the Austro-Hungarian ambassador in Berlin.

== Negotiations ==
=== Tense exchanges ===
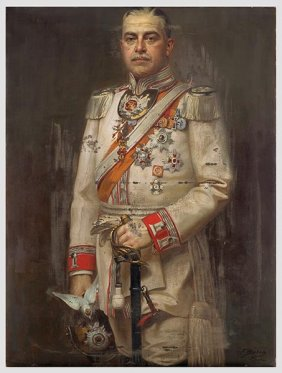
Gottfried von Hohenlohe surprises German negotiators by supporting Czernin's proposals

Against this background of increasing mutual incomprehension between the German Empire and Austro-Hungarian, the tension between the German negotiators and their Austro-Hungarian counterparts was intense.

Ottokar Czernin believed he had obtained his August 1st proposals from the very beginning of the negotiations, but he was quickly corrected by his German interlocutors. However, his stance garnered unexpected support from Gottfried von Hohenlohe, much to the Germans' surprise. (Note: Gottfried von Hohenlohe, the Austro-Hungarian ambassador in Berlin, usually favored unconditional alignment of the dual monarchy's policy with that of the Reich.)

Confronted with an interlocutor who would not make any concessions, Czernin warned his German counterparts that the 1879 alliance might be broken. The German military believed that they could compel the Allies to negotiate by questioning their access to extra-European supplies. By pursuing this strategy, the German military hoped to force the Allies into negotiations based on the territorial status quo of the summer of 1917. (Note: The Austro-Hungarians saw the project as a poker game.) This could entail unilaterally initiating negotiations with the Allies or more possible, positively responding to any solicitations from the Austro-Hungarians. Cognizant of the likelihood of Austro-Hungarian negotiations with the Allies, Richard von Kühlmann attempted to stall by presenting the protocol of August 9 as the "desiderata of the High Command", but was quickly contradicted by the Chancellor, a neophyte in foreign policy.

=== Austro-Hungarian proposals ===
Faced with a worsening domestic situation, Austro-Hungarian officials were willing to offer concessions.

Ottokar Czernin reiterated the proposals he had presented in Vienna on August 1. At that time, Czernin proposed that Austrian Galicia be given to restored Poland in exchange for the Reich returning part of Alsace-Lorraine to France, specifically in the Belfort region. Consequently, Czernin accepted the principle of a triple German trusteeship, encompassing political, economic, and commercial realms, in Poland, as a result of these territorial exchanges.

These propositions were categorically dismissed by the German delegation, backed by the conclusions reached during the August 9 conversations among the Dioscuri and the Reich Chancellor and State Secretary for Foreign Affairs.

=== German counter-proposals ===
The main focus of the conference held in Kreuznach on August 9 was the Austro-Hungarian conditions for ending the conflict, which had been known since August 1.

At the German-Austro-Hungarian meeting, the Chancellor reiterated the German war aims set out at Kreuznach on April 23. The Reich representatives demanded the cessation of conflict, which necessitated France conceding the Longwy-Briey metallurgical basin, Belgium ceding Liege and the Flandre maritime, and Russia ceding a broad border strip in Poland, Lithuania, and the Curonian Spit. (Note: Since August 25, 1915, these last two regions have formed the territorial jurisdiction of the Ober Ost.)

Parallel to these plans, the German Empire aimed to promote Ukrainian separatism for the benefit of the Central Powers. As a result, the German Chancellor suggested transferring Eastern Galicia, which was formerly Austrian territory, to the Ukraine with the promise of granting independence.

== Issue ==
On August 17, 1917, Imperial Chancellor Georg Michaelis sent Ottokar Czernin a letter reporting on a conference outcome and restating the conclusions arrived at during the August 14 negotiations.

=== German targets maintained ===
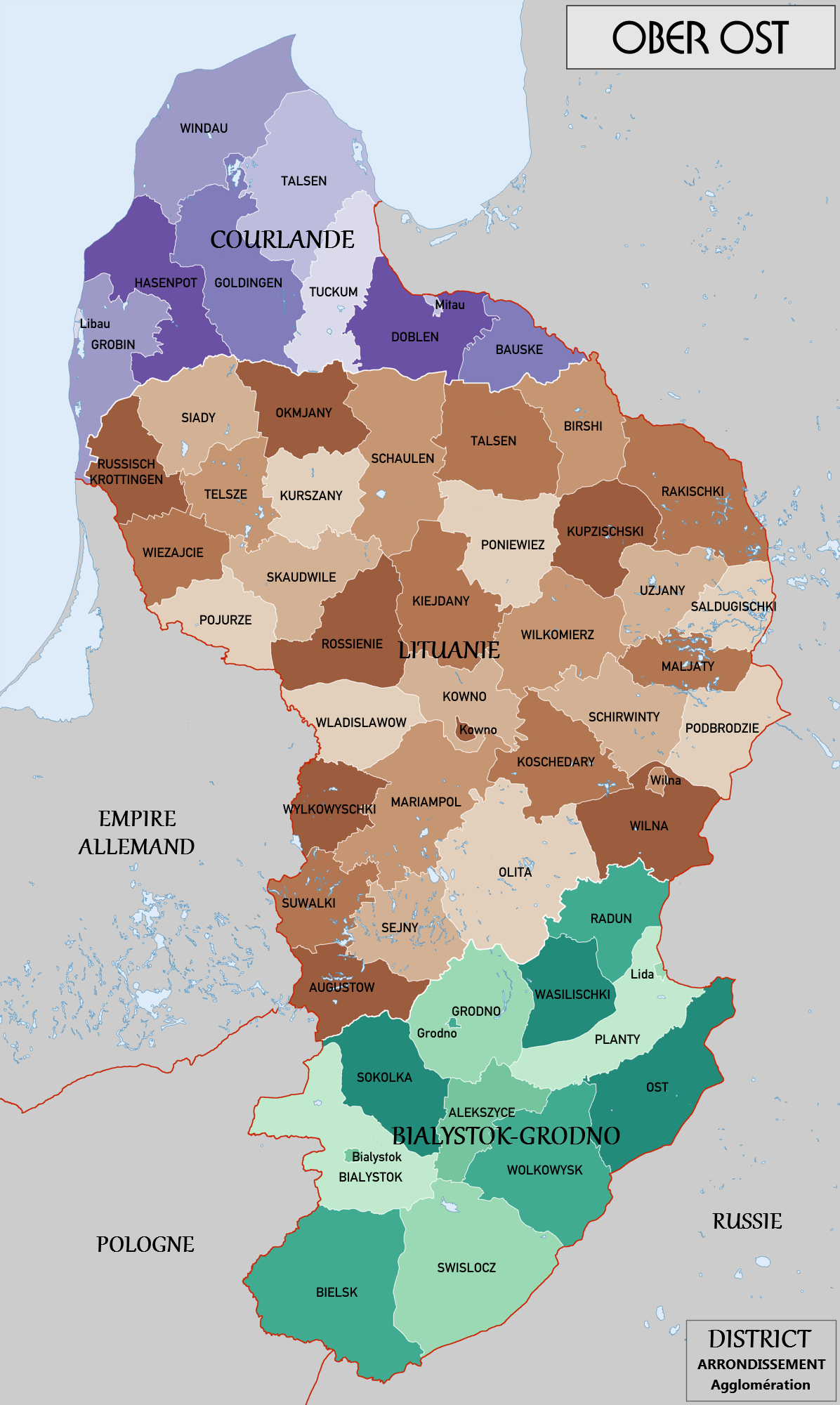
There was a consensus among German politicians to control the territories, administered within the framework of the Ober Ost.

Faced with representatives of the dual monarchy, weakened by the prolonged conflict, the Chancellor and his ministers imposed German expansion in Europe, disregarding Austro-Hungarian proposals to maintain the status quo. However, to appease his Austro-Hungarian counterparts, Richard von Kühlmann advocated for the establishment of indirect German control in Europe.

Control of the French, Belgian, and Luxembourg coalfields persisted as a top priority for the Reich government. As part of this effort, French Lorraine was slated to be returned to France; however, German control over the companies operating in the region's basin was to remain stringent. Through majority stakes in the capital, the Reich aimed to ensure its control over the Lorraine coalfield in line with legal guarantees provided by peace treaties.

However, as Austro-Hungary's strength diminished and the possibility of a separate peace agreement between the dual monarchy and the Allies arose, the Reich Chancellor rethought his goals for the German Empire. Initially advocating for European annexations and the creation of a large colonial empire in Africa, he was prompted to modify his vision in light of these changing circumstances. Georg Michaelis and his delegation agreed to a peace based on a territorial status quo. However, the Germans were insistent that any clause allowing for German territorial expansion in Lithuania, Livonia, and Courland, or even in Flanders, not be excluded by the Austro-Hungarian negotiators, yet instead be on the table in the event that the Reich was successful in establishing "voluntary links" with a significant portion of the population.

=== Increasingly marked differences ===
At the conclusion of these tense negotiations, Austro-Hungarian representatives became increasingly doubtful about the odds of success for the Quadruplice. Czernin grew frustrated with German intransigence and claimed that the Reich government was risking everything by persisting with the submarine war launched on February 1, 1917.

For Austro-Hungarian leaders, "playing double or nothing" entailed casting doubt on the survival of the dual monarchy. This policy induced a sense of "panic" (Note: In the words of Annie Lacroix-Riz.) among these individuals, which raised doubts about the strength of the German-Austro-Hungarian alliance: in fact, during this phase of the war, Austrian-Hungarian ministers were attempting to safeguard the dual monarchy from imminent defeat by all possible means.

Keeping this in mind, Czernin, with the support of Kronprinz Wilhelm, endeavored to obstruct the strategy pursued by Wilhelm II, Chancellor Georg Michaelis, and the Dioscuri, seeking substantial German annexations in Europe. Indeed, the Crown Prince strongly urged his father to initiate negotiations for a swift peace that would reinstate the pre-war status quo.

== See also ==
- Kingdom of Poland (1917–1918)
- History of Austria-Hungary during World War I
- Ober Ost
- Germany's Aims in the First World War
- Kreuznach Conference (August 9, 1917)
