= Crisis of July 1917 =

German government crisis during World War I

The crisis of July 1917 was a political crisis experienced by the German Reich (Note: From 1871 to 1945, the official name of the German state was Deutsches Reich. For the sake of convenience, the German Empire was subsequently referred to simply as the Reich.) between July 7 and 13, 1917.

It marked the climax of the conflict between Chancellor Theobald von Bethmann-Hollweg and the German military, which had the backing of Crown Prince Wilhelm. This ended in the military's favor. As a result, the Chancellor's reform program was scrapped, his chief sponsor was dismissed, and a statesman they considered more pliable, Georg Michaelis, was appointed to the top post.

== The German Reich in the early summer of 1917 ==
=== Military and economic situation ===
During the winter of 1916-1917, the German military imposed a new strategy based on using submarines to disrupt the Allied supply chain through the American economy, promising the success of unrestricted submarine warfare within six months.

Moreover, by the end of spring 1917, the domestic situation in the Reich was deteriorating as a result of a growing supply crisis: the 1916 potato harvest, the mainstay of the Reich's diet, had been poor, while the Reichsmark had been devalued; these shortages were exacerbated by the problems of the German railways, which were facing worrying wear and tear on their rolling stock. The gravity of the domestic situation was not lost on the military, which was seriously contemplating a German defeat, as Colonel Bauer, a close advisor to Erich Ludendorff, confessed to Matthias Erzberger on June 10, 1917.

On June 19, Erich Ludendorff blamed the civilians responsible for maintaining morale for the German defeat he was beginning to foresee. On June 27, Paul von Hindenburg echoed this analysis in a letter to Wilhelm II.

In an attempt to remedy the declining morale of the Reich's population, the military called for a massive propaganda campaign to "supply the morale" of the population.

=== The German Reich and the New Russia ===
The February Revolution led German political and military leaders to believe that the end of hostilities on the Eastern Front was at hand.

During the spring of 1917, as early as March 26, numerous unofficial contacts took place in Stockholm between Central Powers diplomats and their Russian counterparts; these contacts, publicized by the German and neutral press, raised German public hopes for a separate peace with the Russians. These contacts were cut short, however, by the erratic policies of the Russian Provisional Government during the spring, which sought to reconcile a war-weary population with a desire to remain faithful to the alliances entered into by the Imperial Government.

The start of the Kerensky offensive on July 1, 1917, dashed the hopes raised by the publicity surrounding the unofficial German-Russian talks.

=== Reform programs ===
By the end of the first three years of the war, discontent had spread to large sections of the Reich's population, prompting Chancellor Theobald von Bethmann-Hollweg to multiply his promises of national reform, both for the Reich and for the Kingdom of Prussia, the Reich's main federated state. (Note: The Bismark Reich was made up of 39 federated states, headed by the King of Prussia.)

On April 7, 1917, the Chancellor officially declared his support for the end of multiple voting and the introduction of universal suffrage in Prussia, angering Prussian conservatives allied with Erich Ludendorff, then First Quartermaster General of the German Army.

== Participants in the crisis ==
=== The emperor and his entourage ===
Wilhelm II could only acknowledge the growing opposition against his Chancellor as his power waned and increasingly absent from the management of the conflict, the Emperor was forced to accept the Dioscuri's growing interference in the day-to-day affairs of the Reich.

As the military began to contemplate a fourth winter of war, the Emperor ordered his Chancellor to prepare a large-scale propaganda campaign to remobilize the population weary of the conflict and he advocated the formation of a Ministry of Propaganda to combat this weariness. And so it is, on June 25, the Chancellor undertook to intensify the "brainwashing" of the population.

=== The military confronts the chancellor ===
There were two opposing visions of how to conduct the conflict during this crisis: on the one hand, the Chancellor, who was aware that the Reich and its allies could not impose a peace of victory on the Allies, and on the other, the military, which rejected any compromise peace.

Bethmann-Hollweg's national reform program was another bone of contention with the military. He sought to transform the empire inherited from Bismarck into a parliamentary monarchy, with the introduction of universal suffrage for the election of representatives to the Prussian Chamber as a first step. In the face of this program of reform, the Dioscuri, supported by the Prussian conservatives, opposed it.

In parallel with this opposition, the Chancellor wrote to the High Command on June 25 expressing his intention to carry out the requested propaganda campaign; however, he seemed increasingly skeptical about the prospects for German victory as the conflict dragged on and the military imposed maximalist war aims that Bethmann-Hollweg believed would jeopardize any negotiations with the Allies.

On June 27, Hindenburg replied to the Chancellor in a letter to Wilhelm II. In this letter, the Field Marshal painted a highly critical picture of German government policy as a whole and reaffirmed his faith in German victory on the condition that he pursue a more energetic policy with a view to victory.

== The course of the crisis ==
=== Parliamentary session ===
In early July, the Reichstag was convened to pass new war credits. This allowed Social Democratic and Catholic deputies to demand a more extensive debate on Germany's war aims and the adoption of a program of domestic reforms, including the introduction of universal suffrage for elections to the Landtag of Prussia.

In addition, on July 6, at a secret meeting of the Reichstag's Main Committee, Matthias Erzberger made a harsh assessment of the policy pursued since the outbreak of the submarine war on February 1, 1917, which he regarded as a failure. (Note: The proponents of this strategy had promised that the British would withdraw after six months of submarine warfare.)

=== Peace and National Reform ===
In light of this attitude, Bethmann-Hollweg was in favor not only of a reform of the Prussian constitution but also of a compromise peace with the Allies.

== Consequences ==
=== Resignation of the Chancellor ===
Outvoted in the Reichstag, Chancellor Bethmann-Hollweg submitted his resignation to the Emperor, who quickly accepted it.

The resignation of the Chancellor, who had been in office since 1909, was followed by the appointment of the more pliable Georg Michaelis, who had to contain the deputies in favor of peace talks with the Allies.

== See also ==
- German Empire
- Wilhelm II
- Theobald von Bethmann Hollweg
- Paul von Hindenburg
- Erich Ludendorff
- Georg Michaelis
- Dioscuri (World War I)
- Oberste Heeresleitung
- Germany's Aims in the First World War
