= Dioscuri (World War I) =

Dictatorship of Erich Ludendorff and Paul von Hindenburg

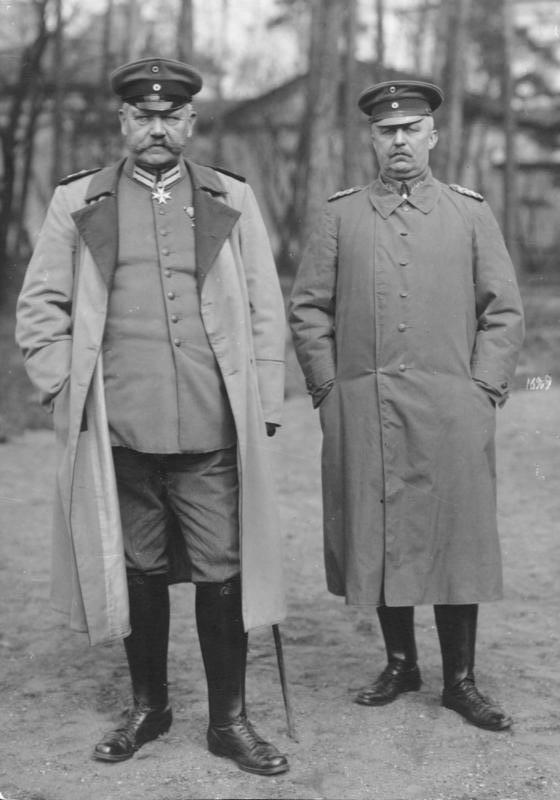
The Dioscuri: Paul von Hindenburg and Erich Ludendorff, September 23, 1916.

During World War I, the term Dioscuri was used to refer to the OHL duo of Erich Ludendorff and Paul von Hindenburg, after the Dioscuri of Greek mythology. These two soldiers, emboldened by their success against the Russians, exercised full military power in the Reich from 1916. The dismissal of Theobald von Bethmann-Hollweg on July 19, 1917, marked a milestone in the rise of the two soldiers, who gradually imposed their vision of managing the conflict on Kaiser Wilhelm II, forcing him to establish a military dictatorship disguised by the institutions of the Reich. (Note: Between the proclamation of the German Empire in 1871 and its dissolution in 1945, the official name of the German state was Deutsches Reich, the legal term for the Reich.)

== Circumstances surrounding the duo's creation ==
=== Success on the Eastern Front ===
By the end of 1915, the two leaders of the Eastern Front had emerged as credible successors to Erich von Falkenhayn as Chief of the General Staff of the Kaiserliche Heer. Indeed, their victories in 1914 gave them the prestige of "saviors of the nation".

However, the relationship between Hindenburg and Ludendorff, who was then in charge of the Eastern Front, and the Chief of the General Staff, Erich von Falkenhayn, soon soured. The two commanders of the Eastern Front saw it as the main front of conflict for the Central Powers, but Falkenhayn believed that German victory could only come from a decision to confront France. Applying his ideas to the personnel on the field, he allocated to the Eastern Front only what was strictly necessary to hold the positions he won.

=== Allied offensive, summer 1916 ===
The Allies planned concerted offensives against the Central Powers in Galicia, France, and Italy at the Chantilly Conference in late 1915. The first, launched on the Eastern Front on June 4, 1916, produced significant results against Austro-Hungarian troops, who were quickly overwhelmed, but it was halted at the edge of the Carpathian Mountains for lack of sufficient air power.

This offensive was followed by the Franco-British push on the Somme, launched on a German front weakened by the retreats from the Eastern Front and on the verge of being torn apart. This gigantic battle of attrition robbed the German army of its most experienced cadres.

These two offensives were supported by an Italian attack on Asiago, launched on August 6, 1916, which broke through the Austro-Hungarian front on August 9, but failed in its exploitation phase, failing to turn the pursuit of the Austro-Hungarian units into a rout.

=== The reaction of the Central Powers ===
In the face of this concerted offensive, the German military reiterated its desire for a reorganization of command on the Eastern front. On July 26, 1916, the Northern Front was placed under the responsibility of Hindenburg, assisted by Ludendorff, and the Southern Front was nominally entrusted to the Austro-Hungarian Crown Prince Charles.

=== Nomination ===
Erich von Falkenhayn's position became increasingly precarious with the worrisome military situation of the Central Powers in midsummer 1916. His strategic decisions were questioned, and his advocacy of social measures for industrial workers led industrialists to criticize his munitions policy. These grievances led the emperor to question the position of his Chief of Staff and to focus on the two German leaders of the Eastern Front: Paul von Hindenburg and his second-in-command, Erich Ludendorff.

On August 29, 1916, Wilhelm II asked them to come to Pless, which was then the headquarters of the General Staff. Erich von Falkenhayn, who had not been informed of this invitation by his sovereign, felt disgraced and, drawing the consequences, asked to be relieved of his duties.

== Action during the conflict ==
Immediately after their appointment, the two soldiers set to work and quickly became the top commanders of the Quadruplice for Wilhelm II.

=== People responsible for OHL ===
Wilhelm II appointed Hindenburg Chief of the General Staff and Ludendorff First Quartermaster General, a title created for the occasion, due to their popularity with the German people.

=== The coordination of offensive actions by the central powers ===
As soon as they were appointed, the Dioscuri began negotiations with the civilian and military leaders of the Austro-Hungarian, Bulgarian, and Ottoman Empires to gain effective command of the armies of the Quadruplice.

Thus, on September 6, 1916, Wilhelm II was appointed commander-in-chief of the German and Austro-Hungarian armies under an agreement ratified by Franz Joseph in consultation with the Austro-Hungarian Chief of Staff, Franz Conrad von Hötzendorf. However, this military agreement was not met with enthusiasm, as Conrad, supported by Crown Prince Charles, expressed his reservations, about the language barrier (Note: Officers of the dual monarchy commanded their men in their own language and communicated with each other in German.) and the contempt the Germans had for the troops of the Dual Monarchy. These reservations enabled him to negotiate the place of the Austro-Hungarian Armeeoberkommando in the planning and execution of the Quadruplice Offensive.

Shortly thereafter, the provisions of this agreement were extended to Bulgarian units campaigning in the Balkans and to Ottoman armies fighting the Russians, Serbs, French, and British.

=== The political role of the Reich and its allies ===
Quickly becoming indispensable to the Empire, the two military men forming the Dioscuri pair became increasingly influential in German politics.

Their appointment led to a decline in the emperor's influence in imperial politics. Already sidelined from the military management of the conflict, Wilhelm II tried to influence the policy of the warring Reich. However, he was briefed daily on military developments by the Dioscuri, both of whom were respectful to the emperor but limited to the role of figuration and validation of decisions already made.

Not content with imposing their decisions on the emperor, Hindenburg, and Ludendorff constituted a significant pole of influence in the political life of the Reich. This influence was first evident in their choice of ministers. On November 28, 1916, shortly after their appointment, Ludendorff obtained from Chancellor Theobald von Bethmann Hollweg (Note: On this occasion, the Chancellor and the Chief Quartermaster General joined forces against the Prussian Minister of War.) the dismissal of the Prussian Minister of War, Adolf Wild von Hohenborn, a little-known but essential player in the management of the war in the Reich during the first two years of the conflict.

== The dissolution of the association ==
=== The defeat in 1918 ===
On September 28, 1918, with the military situation of the Reich and its allies of the Quadruplice deteriorating by the hour, the Dioscuri met and concluded that the Reich needed to enter into negotiations with the Allies as soon as possible to cease hostilities.

Once this decision was made, it was imposed on the Reich's political leaders, who met with the military the next day. The Spa Conference was supposed to result in implementing a clear political line for a rapid end to the conflict. It was mainly an opportunity to impose the civilian government's demand for an armistice on a defeated Reich.

=== The resignation of Ludendorff ===
Ludendorff multiplied his false accusations against government members once the idea of an armistice with the Allies and the principle of reforming the political organization of the Reich had been accepted.

First, he blamed the Bulgarians who, by withdrawing from the conflict, had forced the Germans to urgently build up an army in Serbia to stop the Allied armies.

Second, he attacked the supporters of a compromise peace with the Allies-the Socialists, Catholics, and Progressives who had formed a parliamentary coalition with a majority in the Reichstag since 1917.

== See also ==
=== Bibliography ===
- Bogdan, Henry (2014). Le Kaiser Guillaume II : Le dernier empereur d'Allemagne (in French). Tallandier. ISBN 979-1021005174.
- Fischer, Fritz (1970). Les Buts de guerre de l'Allemagne impériale (in French). Translated by Geneviève Migeon and Henri Thiès. Éditions de Trévise.
- Jardin, Pierre (2008). "La fin de la guerre en Allemagne". Revue Historique des Armées (in French). pp. 35–46.
- Laparra, Jean-Claude; Hesse, Pascal (2011). L'envers des parades : Le commandement de l'armée allemande : réalités et destins croisés 1914-1918 (in French). Paris: Soteca. ISBN 978-2916385778.
- Le Naour, Jean-Yves (2016). 1918 : L'étrange victoire (in French). Paris: Perrin. ISBN 978-2262030384.
- Ortholan, Henri (2021). L'armée austro-hongroise : 1867-1918 (in French) (Revised ed.). Giovanangeli. ISBN 978-2810010578.
- Renouvin, Pierre (1948). La Crise européenne et la Première Guerre mondiale (in French). Vol. 19. Presses universitaires de France. ISSN 0768-5246.
- Schiavon, Max (2011). L'Autriche-Hongrie dans la Première Guerre mondiale : La fin d'un empire (in French). Soteca. ISBN 978-2-916385-59-4.
- Soutou, Georges-Henri (1989). L'or et le sang : Les Buts de guerre économiques de la Première Guerre mondiale (in French). Paris: Fayard. ISBN 978-2213022154.

=== Related articles ===
- Castor and Pollux
- Oberste Heeresleitung
- World War I
- Wilhelm II
- Georg von Hertling
- Paul von Hindenburg
- Erich Ludendorff
