= Oberste Heeresleitung =

German Army high command (1871–1919)

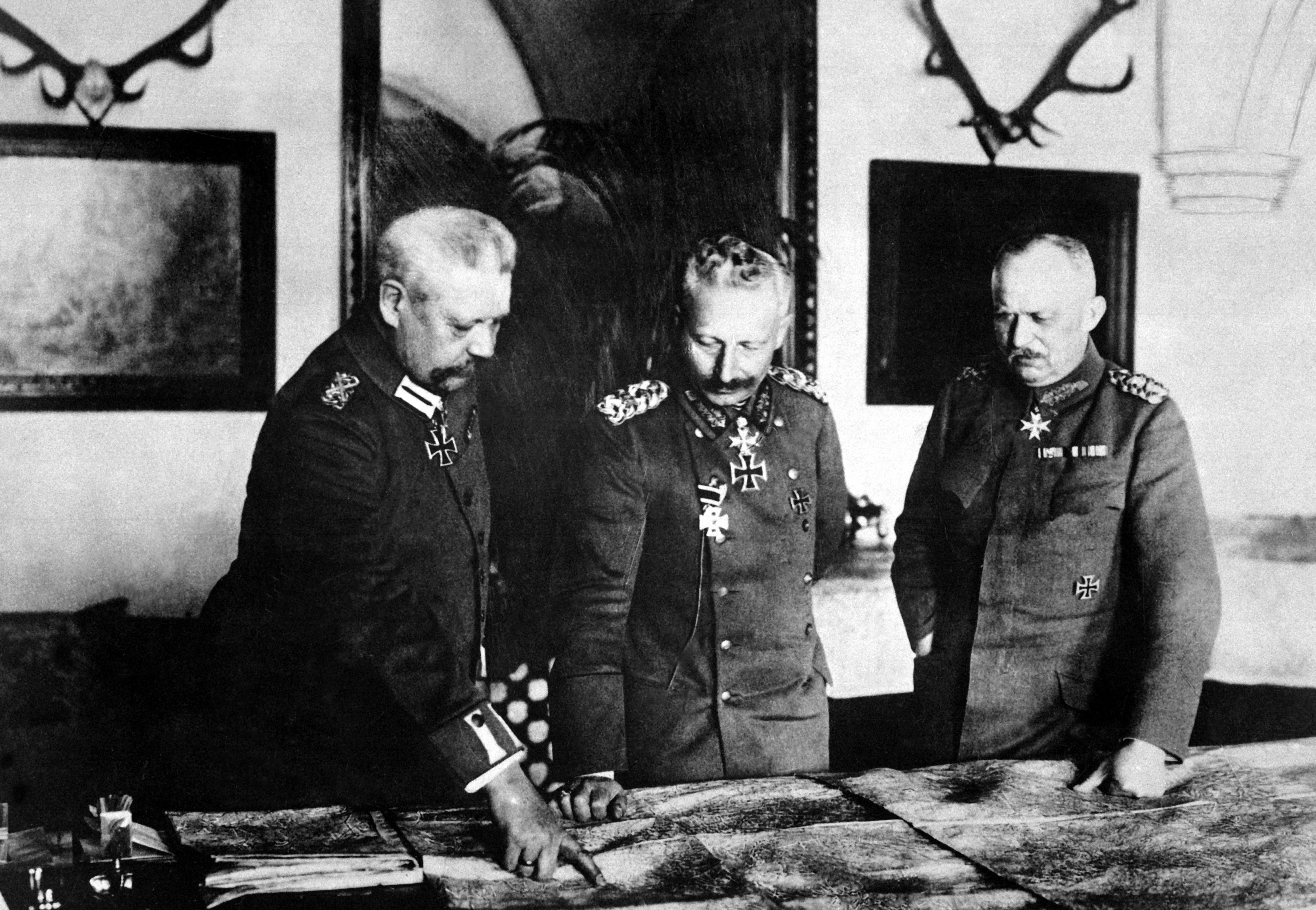
Paul von Hindenburg, Wilhelm II and Erich Ludendorff in January 1917

The Oberste Heeresleitung (German pronunciation: [ˈoːbɐʁstə ˈheːʁəsˌlaɪtʊŋ], "Supreme Army Command", OHL) was the highest echelon of command of the Imperial German Army. In the latter part of World War I, the Third OHL assumed dictatorial powers and became the de facto political authority in the Empire.

== Formation and operation ==
After the formation of the German Empire in 1871, the Prussian Army, Royal Saxon Army, Army of Württemberg and the Bavarian Army were autonomous in peacetime, each kingdom maintaining a separate war ministry and general staff to administer their forces. On the outbreak of war, the Constitution of the German Empire made the German Emperor commander-in-chief of the combined armies (Oberster Kriegsherr, "supreme warlord").

The Emperor's role as commander-in-chief was largely ceremonial and authority lay with the Chief of the German General Staff, who issued orders in the Emperor's name. The pre-war Chief of the General Staff was Colonel General Helmuth von Moltke and the Oberste Heeresleitung was the command staff led by Moltke as Chief of the General Staff of the Army.

The General Staff was initially formed into five divisions and two more were created during the war:

- Central Division (Zentral-Abteilung) – Administered the General Staff's internal affairs.
- Operations Division (Operationsabteilung) – The heart of the General Staff, responsible for planning and orders
  - Operations Division B (Operationsabteilung B) – Oversaw the Macedonia and Turkish fronts. Split from the Operations Division on 15 August 1916.
  - Operations Division II (Operationsabteilung II) – Previously the heavy artillery section of the Operations Division, merged with the Field Munitions Service on 23 September 1916. Responsible for the war economy.
- Information Division (Nachrichtenabteilung) – Responsible for the analysis of military intelligence. Renamed the Foreign Armies Division on 20 May 1917.
- Abteilung III b – Responsible for espionage and counter espionage.
- Political Division (Politische Abteilung) – responsible for legal questions and liaison with the political authorities.

In addition to the General Staff of the Field Army, the Supreme Army Command consisted of the Emperor's Military Cabinet, the Intendant General (responsible for supply), senior advisers in various specialist fields (Artillery, Engineers, Medicine, Telegraphy, Munitions and Railways) and representatives from the four German War Ministries and representatives of the other Central Powers. The Emperor was also Commander-in-Chief of the Imperial German Navy, which was led by the German Imperial Admiralty Staff and from August 1918 by the Seekriegsleitung (SKL, Naval Warfare Command). Co-ordination between OHL and SKL was poor at the beginning of the war. For example, the navy did not even know about the Schlieffen Plan, an initial attack on France through Belgium.

== History ==
=== First OHL ===
Upon mobilizing in 1914 at the outbreak of World War I, the Großer Generalstab (Great General Staff) formed the core of the Supreme Army Command, becoming the General Staff of the Field Army. Colonel General Helmuth von Moltke, who had been Chief of the General Staff since 1906, continued in office, as did most of the division heads. Partially as a result of these longstanding working relationships, Moltke delegated substantial authority to his subordinates, especially to the chiefs of the Operations Division, Colonel Gerhard Tappen, and the Information Division, Lieutenant Colonel Richard Hentsch. These officers were often dispatched to subordinate headquarters to investigate and make decision on behalf of OHL.

Although the German armies were victorious in the Battle of the Frontiers their advance was brought to a halt at First Battle of the Marne. Communications between OHL and the front line broke down and Hentsch was dispatched by Moltke to the headquarters of the 1st Army and the 2nd Army to assess the situation. After discovering that the armies were separated from each other by a gap of 25 mi (40 km) and in danger of being encircled, Hentsch ordered a retreat to the Aisne. On hearing the news from the front, Moltke suffered a nervous breakdown on 9 September.

=== Second OHL ===
Moltke was replaced by the Prussian Minister of War, Lieutenant General Erich von Falkenhayn, first informally in September and then officially on 25 October 1914. Although Tappen was retained as head of the Operations Division, Falkenhayn brought in two of his own associates, General Adolf Wild von Hohenborn and General Hugo von Freytag-Loringhoven, into the OHL. Hohenborn served as Generalquartiermeister until January 1915 when he succeeded Falkenhayn as Prussian Minister of War. Freytag-Loringhoven replaced Hohenborn as Generalquartiermeister. Falkenhayn centralised decision making and emphasised secrecy, rarely explaining himself to his subordinates, which has caused historians difficulty in assessing his intentions. After taking command Falkenhayn became engaged in the Race to the Sea as the German and Franco-British armies attempted to outflank each other to the north. The campaign culminated at First Battle of Ypres where both combatants attacked but failed to make a breakthrough.

Two strategic issues dominated the remainder Falkenhayn's tenure as Chief of the General Staff. First was the priority accorded to the eastern and western fronts. Victories at the Battle of Tannenberg and First Battle of the Masurian Lakes had made Field Marshal Paul von Hindenburg a popular hero and contrasted starkly with the stalemate in the west. Hindenburg and his supporters sought to shift Germany's main effort to the eastern front to knock Russia out of the war. Falkenhayn resisted this, believing that France and Great Britain were the true opponents and that a decisive victory against the Russians was impossible.

The second concern was the Battle of Verdun, the centrepiece of Falkenhayn's western strategy. Falkenhayn wrote after the war that his intention was to draw the French Army into a battle of attrition and wear them down. As the French position became desperate, Falkenhayn expected a British relief effort near Arras which would be destroyed, leaving the remnants of both armies to be mopped up. As the battle developed casualties between the two armies were roughly equal. After the failure of Falkenhayn's strategy at Verdun, the opening of the Battle of the Somme and the entry into the war of the Kingdom of Romania on the Allied side in August 1916, he was replaced on 29 August by Hindenburg.

=== Third OHL ===
The tenure of Field Marshal Paul von Hindenburg became known as the Dritte OHL (Third OHL) but Hindenburg was "neither the intellectual centre of the strategic planning [...] nor of the new war economy", as proposed in the Hindenburg Programme of 31 August 1916. He was mostly a figurehead and a representative of the military command to the public. Control was mainly exercised by his deputy, General of Infantry Erich Ludendorff, who held the title Erster Generalquartiermeister (First Quartermaster General). (Note: Unlike in other armies, the German Generalquartiermeister was not responsible for supply but was the deputy to the Chief of Staff.) The duumvirate increasingly dominated decision making on the German war effort, to an extent that they are sometimes described as de facto military dictators, supplanting the Emperor and Chancellor Theobald von Bethmann Hollweg, whom they managed to have replaced with Georg Michaelis in the summer of 1917. (Note: On 31 October 1917, Georg Michaelis was forced to resign as Chancellor of the German Empire and was replaced with Georg von Hertling. On 30 September 1918 after the capitulation of Bulgaria in the Armistice of Salonica and with both the capitulation of Austria-Hungary and the collapse of the western front imminent, OHL endorsed Prince Maximilian of Baden as replacement for Hertling.)

Through the Hindenburg Programme, a total war strategy, the OHL sought decisive victory. Ludendorff ordered the resumption of the unrestricted U-boat Campaign, which, along with the Zimmermann Telegram, provoked the United States to enter the war. The OHL also ensured safe passage for Lenin and his associates from Switzerland to Russia. After the October coup, the OHL negotiated the Treaty of Brest-Litovsk to free troops for the 1918 German spring offensive on the Western Front. As the tide of the war turned against Germany with the Allied Hundred Days Offensive, in late September 1918, Ludendorff called for the "parliamentarisation" of the German government and immediate armistice negotiations. When he reversed course and demanded the fight to be resumed in October, the government refused his demand and Ludendorff threatened to quit. His bluff was called and he was replaced by Lieutenant-General Wilhelm Groener. Though Ludendorff had expected Hindenburg to follow him, the Field Marshal remained in office until his resignation from the Army in the summer of 1919.

=== Armistice and dissolution ===
As the German Revolution began, Hindenburg and Groener advised the Emperor to abdicate. Groener subsequently came to an agreement with the Social Democrat leader Friedrich Ebert known as the Ebert–Groener pact under which the Army leadership agreed to back the new republican government. With the war over in November 1918, the OHL was moved from Spa to Schloss Wilhelmshöhe in Kassel, to supervise the withdrawal of the German armies from the occupied territories. The final location of the OHL was at Kolberg after February 1919 as the military focus had shifted to preventing territorial encroachment by the Second Polish Republic.

In July 1919, the Supreme Army Command and Great General Staff were disbanded by order of the Treaty of Versailles. For a few days, Groener had replaced Hindenburg as Chief of the General Staff, after the latter resigned in late June. He resigned from his position as head of Kommandostelle Kolberg (as the staff had become on the formal dissolution of the OHL) in September 1919.

== List of commanders ==
No.	Portrait	Supreme Army Commander	Took office	Left office	Time in office
1	Helmuth von Moltke	Generaloberst; Helmuth von Moltke (1848–1916)	1 January 1906	14 September 1914	8 years, 256 days
2	Erich von Falkenhayn	General der Infanterie; Erich von Falkenhayn (1861–1922)	14 September 1914	29 August 1916	1 year, 350 days
3	Paul von Hindenburg	Generalfeldmarschall; Paul von Hindenburg (1847–1934)	29 August 1916	3 July 1919	2 years, 308 days

=== Locations ===
- Berlin, Germany (2–16 August 1914)
- Koblenz, Germany (17–30 August 1914)
- Luxembourg City, Luxembourg (30 August – 25 September 1914)
- Charleville-Mézières, France (25 September 1914 – 19 September 1916)
  - Advance Headquarters at Schloss Pless, Germany (9 May 1915 – 15 February 1916)
  - Advance Headquarters at Schloss Pless, Germany (16 August – 20 September 1916)
- Schloss Pless, Germany (20 September 1916 – 10 February 1917)
- Bad Kreuznach, Germany (17 February 1917 – 7 March 1918)
- Spa, Belgium (8 March – 13 November 1918)
  - Advance Headquarters at Avesnes-sur-Helpe, France (18 March – 7 September 1918)
- Schloss Wilhelmshöhe, Germany (14 November 1918 – 10 February 1919)

== See also ==
- Oberkommando des Heeres, the army command within the combined Wehrmacht armed forces of Nazi Germany
- Imperial General Staff
- Grand Quartier Général

== Bibliography ==
- Foley, R. T. (2007) [2005]. German Strategy and the Path to Verdun: Erich von Falkenhayn and the Development of Attrition, 1870–1916 (pbk. ed.). Cambridge: CUP. ISBN 978-0-521-04436-3.
- Gross, G. (2016). Zabecki, D. T. (ed.). The Myth and Reality of German Warfare: Operational thinking from Moltke the Elder to Heusinger. Lexington: University Press of Kentucky. ISBN 978-0-8131-6837-1.
- Haffner, Sebastian (2002). Die deutsche Revolution 1918/19 [The German Revolution, 1918–19] (in German). Kindler. ISBN 3-463-40423-0.
- Leonhard, Jörn (2014). Die Büchse der Pandora: Geschichte des Ersten Weltkriegs [Pandora's Box: History of the First World War] (in German). München: C. H. Beck. ISBN 978-3-406-66191-4.
