= Vienna Conference (October 1917) =

Conference carried out after World War I

Vienna Conference (October 22,1917)
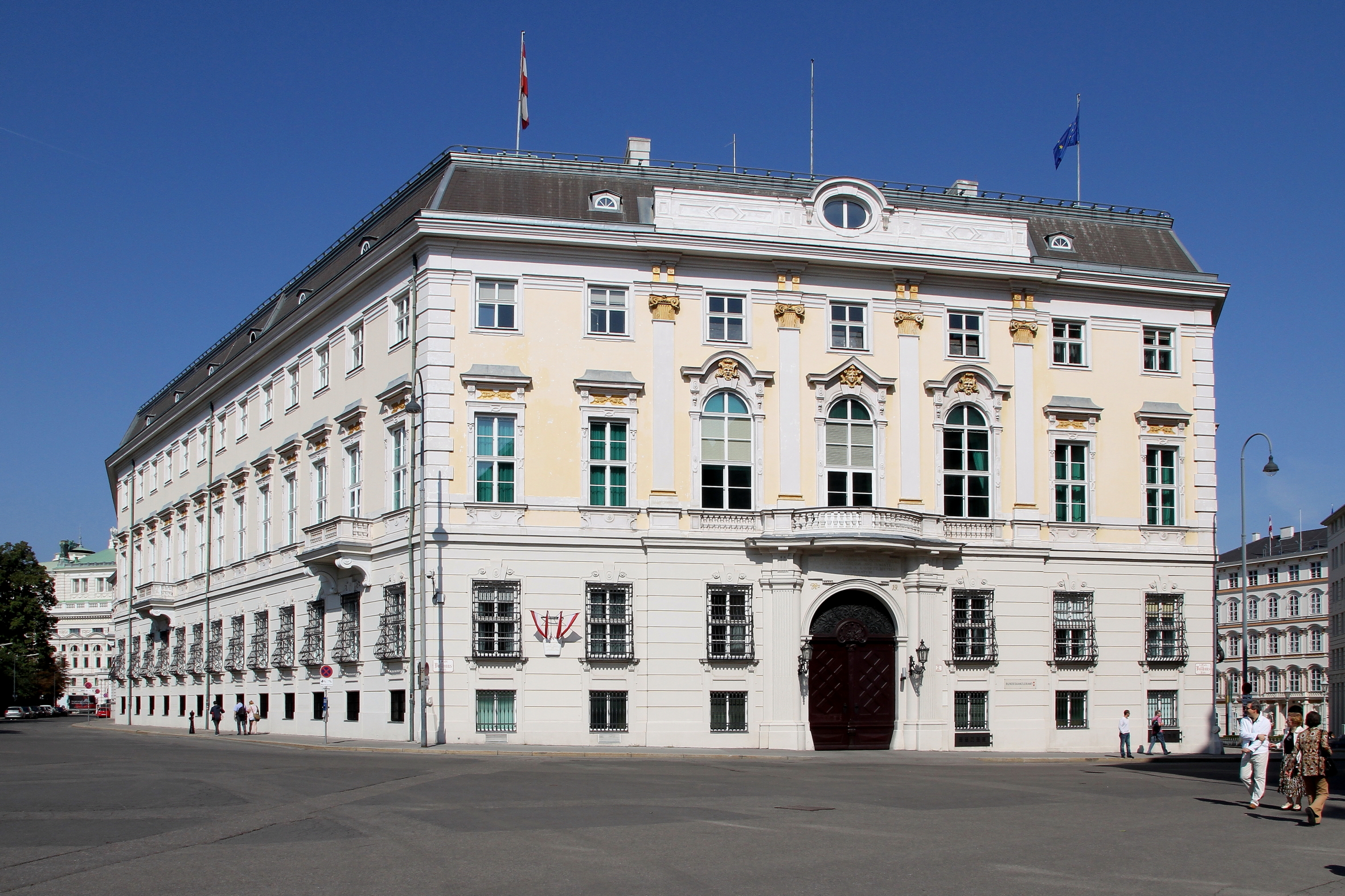
- Headquarters of the Foreign Ministry of the Dual Monarchy, on Vienna's Ballhausplatz (today the official residence of the Austrian Federal Chancellor).
- Date: October 22,1917
- Location: Vienna
- Type: Strategy meeting
- Participants: Richard von Kühlmann, Ottokar Czernin, Georg Michaelis, Gottfried zu Hohenlohe and Botho von Wedel
- Outcome: Reaffirmation of the Reich's war aims

The Vienna Conference of October 22, 1917 was a German-Austro-Hungarian governmental conference designed to finalize the sharing of the Central Powers European conquests. Meeting in a difficult context for both empires, it resulted in the drafting of a detailed program of German and Austro-Hungarian war aims, referred to by German historian Fritz Fischer as the "Vienna directives", proposing a new program of war aims for the Imperial German Reich, while defining the objectives of the dual monarchy, which was to be further integrated into the German sphere of influence.

== Context ==
During the autumn of 1917, the Reich took every opportunity to redefine the terms of the agreements negotiated the previous May at Kreuznach, attempting to exchange Poland, which had been promised to the Reich but split into German and Austro-Hungarian zones of occupation, for Romania, a territory promised to Austria-Hungary.

=== The Reich and Allied war aims ===
In the autumn of 1917, the majority of German political, economic and military leaders became clearly aware of the Allies' desire to perpetuate their policy of sidelining the Reich on world markets, and to continue blockading the Reich beyond the end of the conflict.

In light of this realization, the Reich government, with the support of the business community, tried to find ways to prepare for an economic end to the conflict. The Dioscures, in particular Erich Ludendorff, favored solutions designed to ensure that the Reich could set up an economic unit to achieve autarky in Central Europe, reorganized for the benefit of Germany, or failing that, obtain long-term agreements with neighboring states.

=== The Reich and the double monarchy ===
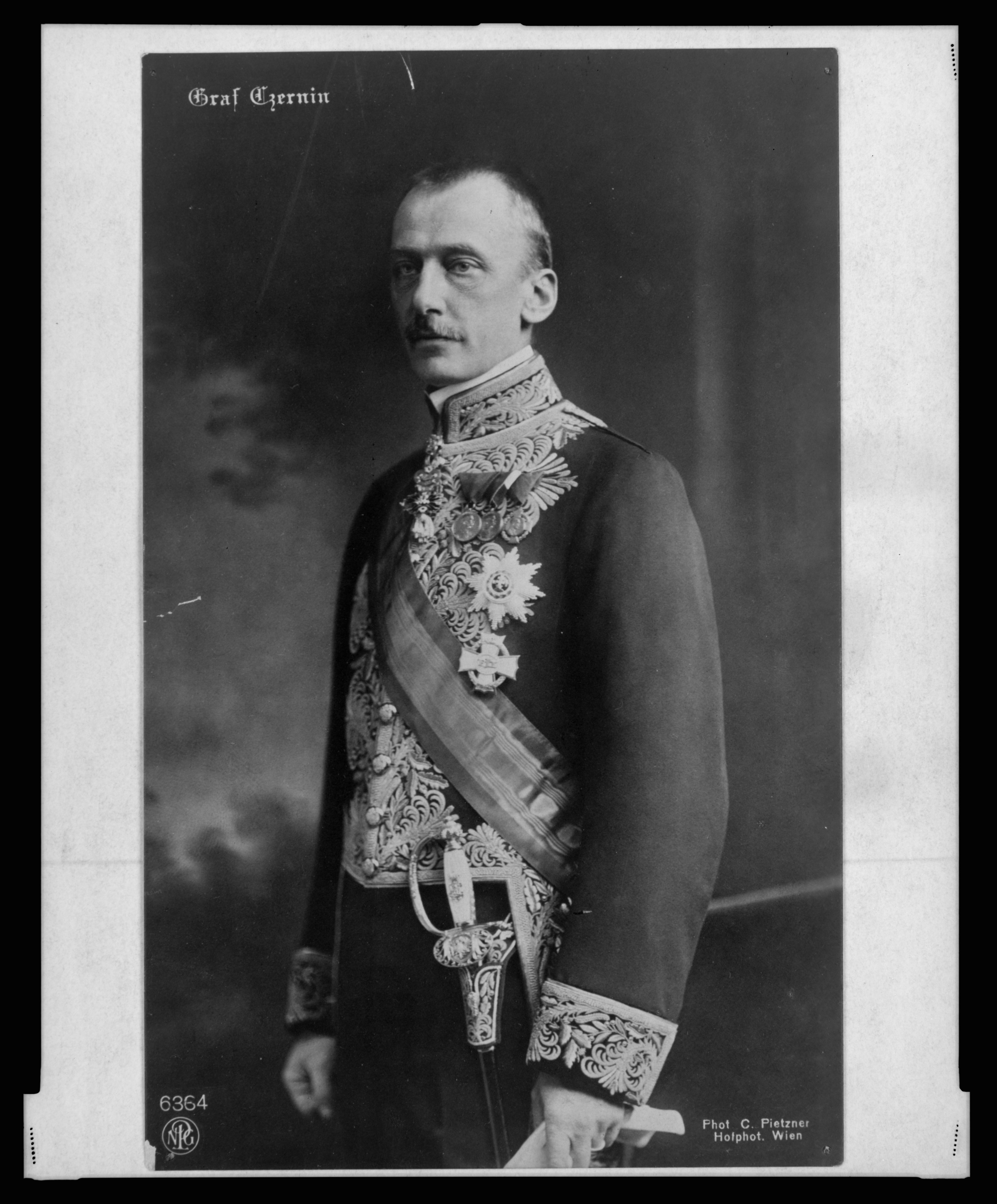
Ottokar Czernin, Austro-Hungarian Foreign Minister, defended the interests of the dual monarchy.

Since Franz Josef's death, his successor Charles I has taken numerous initiatives to extricate Austria-Hungary from its alliance with the Reich.

All these attempts, made in agreement with his foreign minister, Ottokar Czernin, were soon met with an outcry from the Reich: internal reforms in the Austrian Empire, as well as the establishment of a Cabinet of National Concentration comprising representatives of all the nationalities represented in the Vienna Reichsrat, met with an absolute veto from the Reich ambassador.

Moreover, since August 1917, Ottokar Czernin, the Austro-Hungarian Minister for Foreign Affairs, increasingly panicked by the gravity of the dual monarchy's domestic situation, had been making repeated attempts to persuade the Reich to put an end to Austro-Hungarian participation in the conflict. However, at his first meeting with Georg Michaelis in Vienna on August 1, the Austro-Hungarian failed to negotiate the opening of peace negotiations with the Allies.

Then, at the Bellevue meeting on the same day, the Dioscuri approved preparations for an offensive against Italy, designed to draw the conflict away from Austro-Hungarian territory. Although cautious about the impact of this offensive on the overall development of the conflict, the German military, spurred on by Charles I's missives to Wilhelm II, accepted the principle in order to guarantee continued Austro-Hungarian participation in the conflict alongside the Reich.

Finally, since the resignation of German Imperial Chancellor Theobald von Bethmann Hollweg, relations between the two empires have become more brutal. Wilhelm II and the Dioscuri no longer hesitated to threaten their Austro-Hungarian interlocutors, notably Gottfried von Hohenlohe, the imperial and royal ambassador in Berlin, on July 13, while Emperor Charles was closely watched by the German ambassador in Vienna.

=== An alarming domestic situation ===
Since the summer of 1916, the Central Powers have been under the strict guidance of the Dioscuri, whose actions have tended to be increasingly intrusive in the daily life of the Reich and the Dual Monarchy. What's more, the German and Austro-Hungarian populations have been suffering for months from an increasingly problematic situation, with risks for the internal cohesion of the Reich and the Dual Monarchy.

Since the failure of the peace resolution in July, the German military have imposed a chancellor in line with their views, Georg Michaelis, a high-ranking civil servant with great technical skills, but without authority or a government program, who initially proved to be "a docile instrument" of the Dioscuri Paul von Hindenburg and Erich Ludendorff.

The dual monarchy appeared totally exhausted by the conflict: the starving population saw its weight and size diminish, while the number of food riots tended to increase in Austrian cities.

== Participants ==
Held in Vienna, at the headquarters of the joint Austro-Hungarian Foreign Ministry, the conference provided an opportunity for a meeting between the foreign ministers of the two empires, in the presence of the Reich ambassador.

=== German negotiators ===
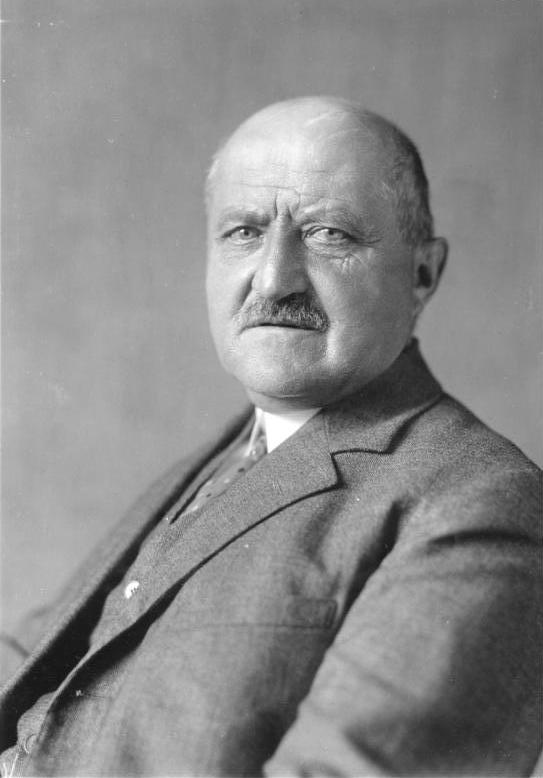
Georg Michaelis (1932), then Reich Chancellor, heads the German delegation in Vienna.

Le chancelier du Reich, Georg Michaelis, mène officiellement la délégation allemande. Cependant, inexpérimenté dans le domaine des négociations internationales et peu au fait de l'état réel des relations entre le Reich et la double monarchie, le chancelier est cantonné à un rôle protocolaire, décoratif : la délégation gouvernementale allemande est dirigée dans les faits par le secrétaire d'État aux affaires étrangères, le diplomate de carrière Richard von Kühlmann, assisté de ses principaux collaborateurs; Botho von Wedel, ambassadeur allemand à Vienne, assiste également aux échanges.

=== Austro-Hungarian negotiators ===
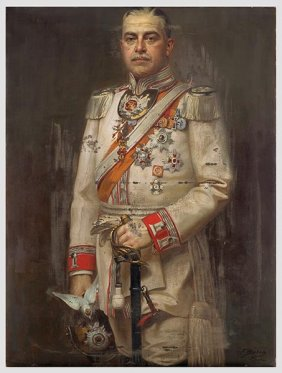
Gottfried von Hohenlohe, pictured here in 1917, took part in the German-Austro-Hungarian talks as ambassador of the dual monarchy in Berlin.

Ottokar Czernin, then joint foreign minister, presided over the discussions, assisted by his principal collaborators.

The Austro-Hungarian ambassador in Berlin, Gottfried zu Hohenlohe-Schillingsfürst, took part in the exchanges between German and Austro-Hungarian ministers and diplomats.

== Divergent positions ==
Once again, the German-Austro-Hungarian negotiations confirmed the differences between the two main partners of the Quadruplice, with no substantive agreement reached between the German statesmen and military on the one hand, and the Austro-Hungarians on the other.

=== Mitteleuropa, Germany's war goal ===
Having been put on hold following the political crisis caused by the fall of Theobald von Bethmann Hollweg in early July 1917, the project to set up a Central European economic bloc was reactivated by State Secretary Richard von Kühlmann at this conference.

However, this objective was perceived differently by civilians and the military, in terms of both means and ends: civilians defined this project as the means of an indirect, but real, trusteeship over the Reich's neighboring countries and in the Balkans, a bridge to the Ottoman Empire; the military advocated a trusteeship based on annexations of territories neighboring the Reich and the submission of the dual monarchy to strict long-term political, economic and military trusteeship.

=== Peace and war ===
Confronted with an increasingly worrying domestic situation, Chancellor Georg Michaelis found himself caught between the Dioscuri and the Reichstag majority in favor of a compromise peace.

In this uncomfortable situation, the Chancellor made a series of blunders against the independent Socialists, notably on October 9, when he reproached them for their attitude during the first mutinies among the crews of the war fleet: pointing to the support of the SPD parliamentarians for the mutineers, Michaelis alienated the support of the SPD parliamentarians, who were nonetheless in favor of a compromise peace with the Allies. In addition, he had to contend with the reservations of Zentrum parliamentarians, members of the parliamentary majority but skeptical about the continuation of the conflict.

In the face of these attacks from the Reichstag, the Chancellor also had to contend with the military, Paul von Hindenburg and Erich Ludendorff, both of whom supported the realization of the Reich's war aims. In fact, the Dioscuri are multiplying initiatives to create a current of opinion favorable to the realization of extensive war aims, by launching press campaigns in favor of the war aims policy, or by exploiting the 400th anniversary of the Protestant Reformation.

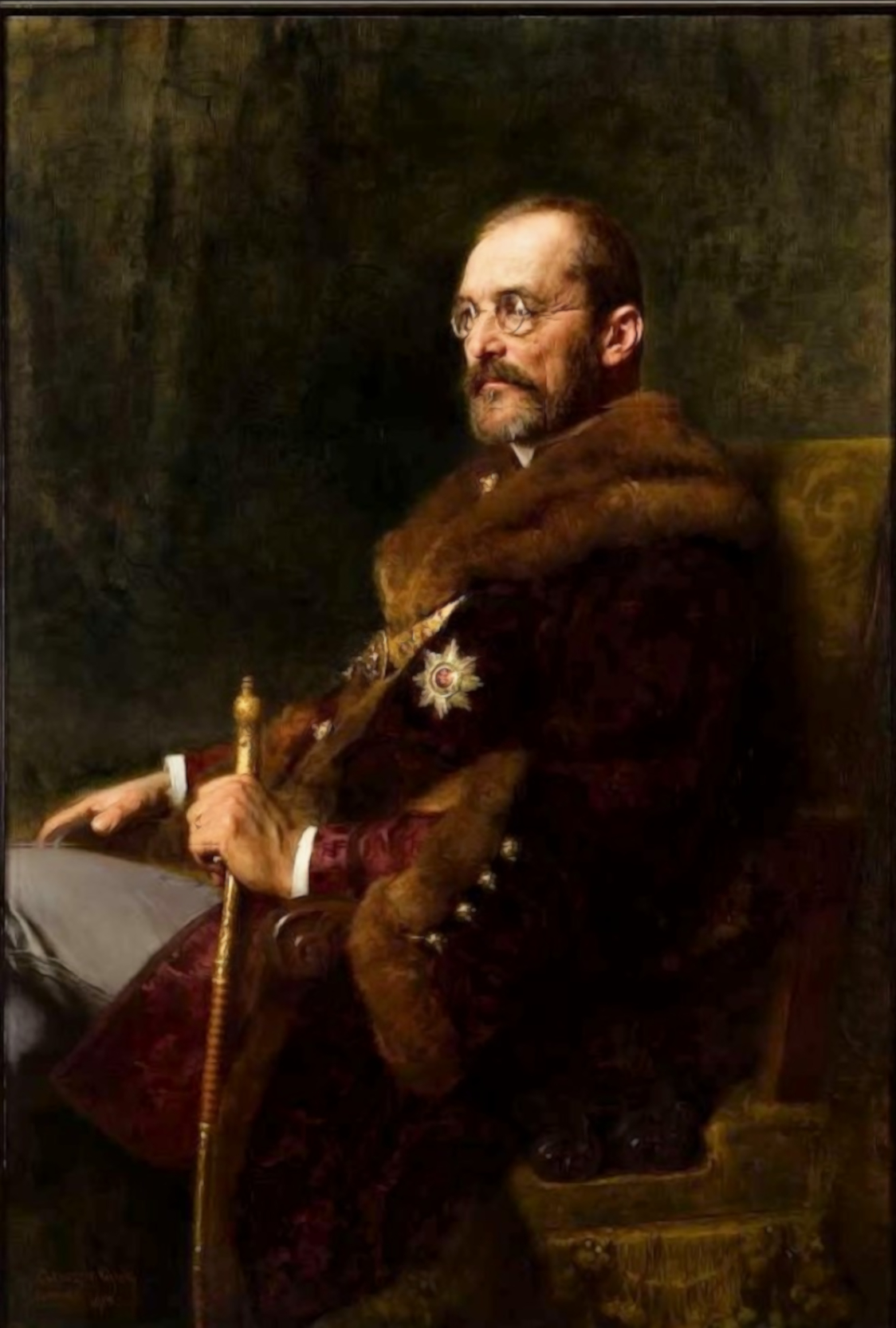
István Tisza, portrayed here by former Hungarian prime minister Gyula Benczúr, expresses his reservations about Ottokar Czernin's reasons for accepting Vienna's directives.

=== A long-term Austro-Hungarian perspective ===
Accepting all the Reich's conditions, Ottokar Czernin, the common foreign minister, based his positions in the Austro-German negotiations of autumn 1917 on long-term calculations.

According to him, the dual monarchy was bound to emerge totally exhausted from the conflict, but the victorious Reich was destined to become unanimously hated by its neighbors and political and commercial partners.

In a statement to the Austro-Hungarian ambassador in Berlin, Gottfried von Hohenlohe, he considered the dual monarchy's subjection to the Reich to be a transitional stage. In Ottokar Czernin's view, the Reich should provide the dual monarchy with the economic and financial means for its future development. Once the dual monarchy was no longer dependent on the Reich, Czernin's successor would find himself in a position to challenge the agreements negotiated with the Reich in 1917, in particular to obtain equal economic and commercial rights within Mitteleuropa.

This long-term analysis of the relationship between the Reich and the Dual Monarchy was not unanimous among the Austro-Hungarian leadership: the former Hungarian Prime Minister, István Tisza, perceived the German desire to use the Dual Monarchy as a springboard for influence in the Balkans and beyond.

== Issue ==
The conference concluded with the drafting of what historian Fritz Fischer calls the "Vienna directives". The minutes of this conference summarize the progress achieved by the negotiators of the two empires.

=== Vienna directives ===
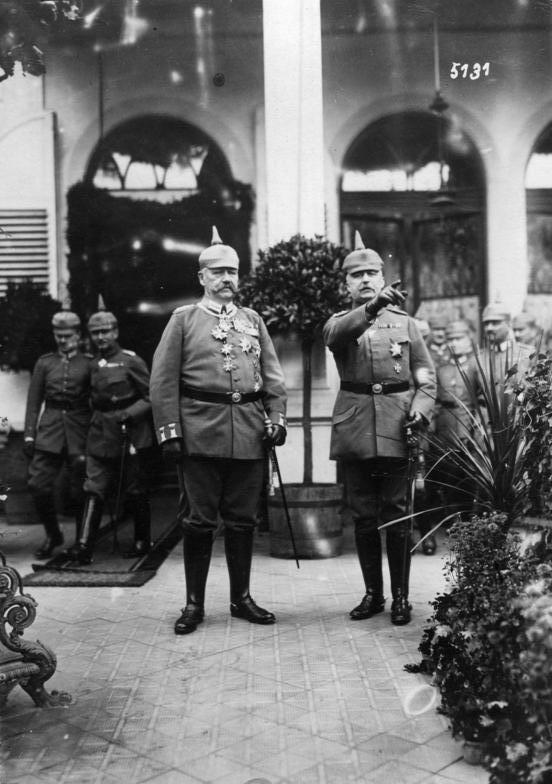
The Dioscuri, Paul von Hindenburg and Erich Ludendorff, here in Kreuznach on October 2, 1917, were unable to impose their views on the members of the Imperial German government.

The expansion plans formulated in this document materialize the reversal of German and Austro-Hungarian ambitions in Poland and Romania; the directives also demonstrate the success of the civilian government members, Georg Michaelis and Richard von Kühlmann, over the military, Paul von Hindenburg and Erich Ludendorff.

Czernin acknowledged the validity of the German demands for Belgium, Courland and Lithuania, but urged the German government "not to stand in the way of a peaceful solution in the West".

In return, Czernin managed to negotiate the maintenance of some of the political, economic and commercial positions of the dual monarchy in the Polish regency, which was largely under German trusteeship.

=== German compensation ===
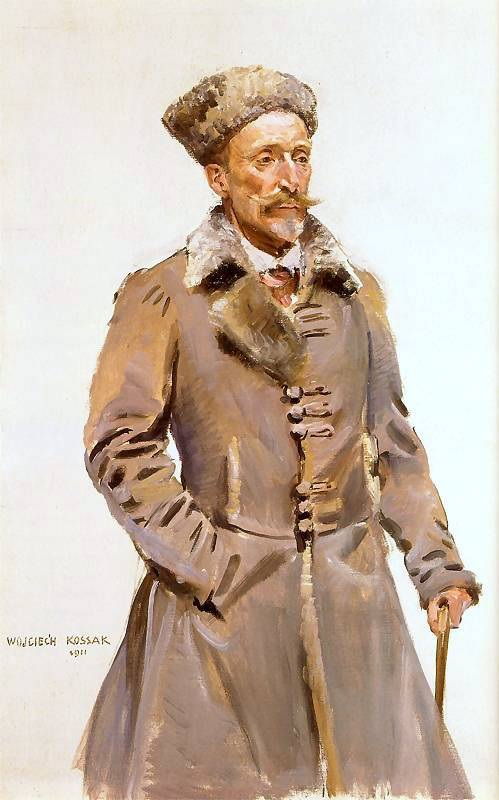
Charles-Étienne de Teschen in 1911 (portrait by Wojciech Kossak), would be recognized as King of Poland. His independent kingdom would be placed under strict German tutelage, depriving its monarch of any real power.

In order to forge closer ties between the Reich and the dual monarchy, the Germans were prepared to relinquish the Polish throne to a Habsburg archduke, Archduke Charles Stephen of Austria, and even to accept the political integration of the kingdom in the process of being formed into the dual monarchy.

However, increasingly reluctant to make concessions to an exhausted ally, the German negotiators assured the Reich of a dominant position in Poland. Indeed, the future king, the Germanophile Charles-Étienne de Teschen, was reduced to the rank of "Austrian cherry on top of the Polish cake": the Vienna directives established a "simple personal union without legal connection" between the Kingdom of Poland and the dual monarchy. This formal Austro-Hungarian-Polish union was supplemented by real German political and economic control.

The reality of this tutelage did not, however, prevent the dual monarchy from maintaining certain economic positions in Poland, notably through stakes in Polish state-owned companies: the Austro-Hungarians thus retained blocking minorities in rail transport companies and in the companies operating the Polish canal network.

=== Economic projects ===
The Vienna Conference also saw a return to the economic liberalism of 1914.

However, the issue remained unresolved, as the Dioscuri, and Erich Ludendorff in particular, showed themselves to be staunch advocates of implementing a protectionist policy, ideally to achieve autarky for the economic bloc controlled by the Reich.

Moreover, the German players in these exchanges advocated the implementation of the most-favoured-nation clause, while the German imperial government multiplied its initiatives to implement this programme once peace had returned.

Finally, part of the talks was devoted to establishing common rail tariffs for the Reich and the Dual Monarchy. Although technical in appearance, the negotiation of this tariff actually placed the Dual Monarchy in a position of strength vis-à-vis the Reich, since the bulk of the Reich's foreign trade to the Balkans and the Ottoman Empire transited through the Dual Monarchy. In this context, the Reich wished to integrate the four-party railway agreement concluded on May 9, 1883 between the Dual Monarchy, Serbia, Bulgaria and the Ottoman Empire.

== Bibliography ==
- Bled, Jean-Paul (2014). L'agonie d'une monarchie : Autriche-Hongrie 1914-1920. Paris: Taillandier. ISBN 979-10-210-0440-5.
- Fischer, Fritz (1970). Les Buts de guerre de l'Allemagne impériale [Les Buts de guerre de l’Allemagne impériale (1914-1918)] (in French). Translated by Migeon, Geneviève; Thiès, Henri. Paris: Éditions de Trévise.
- Lacroix-Riz, Annie (1996). Le Vatican, l'Europe et le Reich : De la Première Guerre mondiale à la guerre froide. Paris: Armand Colin. ISBN 2-200-21641-6.
- Soutou, Georges-Henri (1989). L'or et le sang : Les Buts de guerre économiques de la Première Guerre mondiale. Paris: Fayard. ISBN 2213022151.
- Renouvin, Pierre (1934). La Crise européenne et la Première Guerre mondiale. Paris: Presses universitaires de France.

== See also ==
- Ottokar Czernin
- Georg Michaelis
- Germany's Aims in the First World War
- History of Austria-Hungary during World War I
