= Georg Michaelis =

Chancellor of the German Empire in 1917

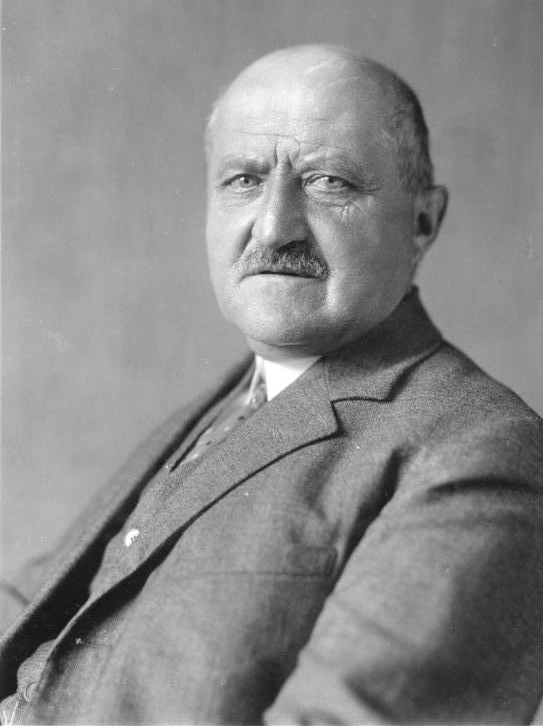
- Michaelis in 1932

Chancellor of the German Empire
- In office 14 July 1917 – 1 November 1917
- Monarch: Wilhelm II
- Deputy: Karl Helfferich
- Leader: Paul von Hindenburg and Erich Ludendorff
- Preceded by: Theobald von Bethmann Hollweg
- Succeeded by: Georg von Hertling

Minister President of Prussia
- In office 14 July 1917 – 1 November 1917
- Preceded by: Theobald von Bethmann Hollweg
- Succeeded by: Georg von Hertling

Personal details
- Born: 8 September 1857 Haynau, Province of Silesia, Kingdom of Prussia
- Died: 24 July 1936 (aged 78) Bad Saarow, Province of Brandenburg, Nazi Germany
- Party: None as Chancellor, later the German National People's Party
- Spouse: Margarete Schmidt
- Children: Elisabeth; Charlotte; Emma; Georg Sylvester; Wilhelm; Eva; Martha
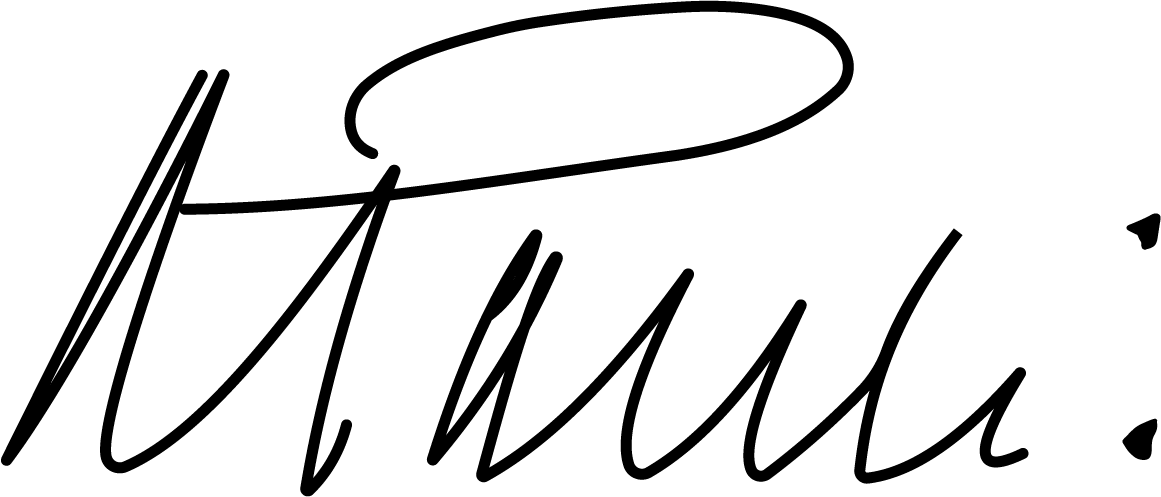
- Signature

Georg Michaelis (8 September 1857 – 24 July 1936) was the imperial chancellor of the German Empire for a few months in 1917 during the First World War. He was the first (and, in the German Empire, the only) commoner to hold the post, though the Supreme Army Command under Paul von Hindenburg had de facto control over the country.

After graduating from law school, Michaelis moved to Tokyo where he taught at the German Studies Society School. Upon his return to Germany, he joined the Prussian civil service. He was appointed undersecretary of state in the Prussian Finance Ministry in 1909, and from 1915 on he headed he headed the Imperial Grain Office and was responsible for food procurement in Prussia during the First World War.

When Theobald von Bethmann Hollweg was forced to resign as chancellor by the Reichstag and the Supreme Army Command, Michaelis was chosen as his successor. His government was wholly dependent on the support of the Supreme Army Command. Shortly after his appointment the Reichstag passed Matthias Erzberger's Peace Resolution for a "a peace without annexations or indemnities", which he refused to fully endorse. Following the summer 1917 naval mutinies at Wilhelmshaven, Michaelis sought to place the blame on the socialists in the Reichstag. The Reichstag in turn forced his resignation as chancellor in favor of Georg von Hertling. He made an attempt to retain his role as minister-president of Prussia but was unsuccessful.

From 1918 to 1919, Michaelis headed the provincial government of Pomerania. After the war he was engaged in economic lobbying, projects for student welfare and Protestant church organizations.

== Biography ==
=== Early life ===
Michaelis, born in Haynau in the Prussian Province of Silesia, grew up in Frankfurt (Oder). He studied jurisprudence at the University of Breslau, the University of Leipzig and the University of Würzburg from 1876 to 1884, becoming a Doctor of Laws.

From 1885-89, he lived and worked in Tokyo, Japan as a law professor of the Law School of the Society for German Sciences.

After his return to Germany, he became a member of the Prussian administration. In 1909 he was appointed as undersecretary of state to the Prussian Treasury in Berlin. From 1915 onward, he headed the Imperial Grain Office, which was responsible for the administration of Prussian corn and wheat during World War I.

=== Chancellor ===
After the Reichstag and the High Command (OHL) forced the resignation of Theobald von Bethmann Hollweg on 10 or 13 July 1917, Michaelis emerged as the surprise candidate for both chancellor of Germany and Minister President of Prussia. Army commander Paul von Hindenburg agreed because Michaelis was the army's man.

He had visited the OHL on several occasions in his position as Undersecretary of State in the Prussian Ministry of Finance and Commissioner of Food Supplies, when his brusque manner had made a good impression on staff officers present. "The truth was that anyone more radical than Bethmann would have been unacceptable to the High Command as Chancellor, while anyone more reactionary would have been unacceptable to the Reichstag; the only way out was to choose a nonentity."

Michaelis was described as "Germany's first bourgeois chancellor". He was the first non-titled person to hold the post, and the only one to serve as chief minister during the House of Hohenzollern's 400-year rule over Brandenburg-Prussia and Germany. But the forces of the German General Staff remained in control behind the scenes.

On 19 July, the Reichstag passed Erzberger's Peace Resolution for "a peace without annexations or indemnities", after the Chancellor's speech had "devalued" the resolution. The inability of the government to impose controls on rising prices, demands for wage increases, strikes, and mounting economic chaos, drove the "political fixers" towards a military takeover of the reins of power. The Kaiser wanted a chancellor who could manage the Reichstag, and the army wanted a chancellor who would bring about a "German Peace".

On 25 July 1917, Michaelis told the crown prince that the devil was in the detail; "I have deprived it of its most dangerous features by my interpretation of it. One can make any peace one likes with this resolution", he reassured the heir to the throne. But it was a feint, and Michaelis’ role in the discreditable episode was designed to facilitate a permanent closure of the Reichstag.

The army perceived the majority parties as posing a threat to stability in Germany in the wake of the Bolshevik Revolution had brought an end to the Russian war effort. But this had left him very "uncertain" as to the place of the Central Powers. Knowing Austro-Hungary was bankrupted by the fighting, he understood their demand to sue for peace; but the military was unwilling to relinquish any power to the civilian authorities. The OHL hoped to destabilize Ukraine and the Baltic States so as to bring Russia's ailing Tsarist regime to the negotiations, while guaranteeing Germanic frontiers, in more than Michaelis' status quo ante bellum.

But Michaelis was a pragmatist and a realist, whatever the Kaiser might have believed about military victory.

Cabinet (July – October 1917)
Office	Incumbent	In office	Party
Imperial Chancellor	Georg Michaelis	14 July 1917 – 24 October 1917	None
Vice-Chancellor of Germany; Secretary of the Interior	Karl Helfferich	22 May 1916 – 23 October 1917	None
Secretary of Foreign Affairs	Arthur Zimmermann	22 November 1916 – 6 August 1917	None
Secretary of Foreign Affairs	Richard von Kühlmann	6 August 1917 – 9 July 1918	None
Secretary of Justice	Hermann Lisco	25 October 1909 – 5 August 1917	None
Secretary of Justice	Paul von Krause	7 August 1917 – 13 February 1919	None
Secretary of the Navy	Eduard von Capelle	15 March 1916 – 5 October 1918	None
Secretary of Economics	Rudolf Schwander (Acting)	5 August 1917 – 20 November 1917	None
Secretary for Food	Adolf Tortilowicz von Batocki-Friebe	26 May 1916 – 6 August 1917	None
Secretary for Food	Wilhelm von Waldow	6 August 1917 – 9 November 1918	None
Secretary of the Post	Reinhold Kraetke	6 May 1901 – 5 August 1917	None
Secretary of the Post	Otto Rüdlin	6 August 1917 – 19 January 1919	None
Secretary of the Treasury	Siegfried von Roedern	22 May 1916 – 13 November 1918	None
Secretary for the Colonies	Wilhelm Solf	20 November 1911 – 13 December 1918	None

The Chancellor chaired the Second Kreuznach Conference discussing the fate of Alsace-Lorraine on 14 August 1917.

The proposal included one for an integrated Federal State coupled to socio-economic changes connecting the Prussian-Hessian railways across Germany. Alsace's connectivity was an extension of a war aims policy via Aachen into the Belgian occupied zones and across neutral Netherlands, as had already been achieved in Luxembourg. Longwiy was the centre of German Steel Association's industry. Located on the border of Belgium and Lorraine, it was at the contractual nexus of the Low Countries adjacent to the Dutch treaty town of Maastricht. German industrialists, including Thyssen and Krupp, wanted a guaranteed supply of coal from France and return to an answer to the Belgian Question, which monopolised the thinkers on the Western Front.

On 29 August, it was in light of the Longwy-Briey Plan railway carriage meeting near Aachen that he was given "an impossible task" of perpetuating the war for "another ten years". But the economic plan Mitteleuropa depended on the Quadruple Alliance which was in trouble. The brains behind the second conference was the new Secretary of State, Max von Kuhlmann, with Czernin and Hohenlohe (Austria) chaired in chamber by Michaelis. But he underestimated Britain's economic determination to stay the course until the bitter end.

The unenviable task to spell out the myth of a German victory fell to Michaelis, still obliged to the Kaiser and OHL in a report to the Conference.

In the end the government won over the Reichstag with only one small party outstanding in its continual opposition to the plan. The Fatherland Party and the OHL, now under Ludendorff, demanded a rigorous pro-Kaiser pursuance of a Rumanian-Germany. Bessarabia, a rich and fertile agricultural basin, was ripe for the Central Powers to pick. Michaelis was sceptical of OHL's avowal of the closest relationship with Austria when another conference was called for 7 October. Still dominated by the obsession with seaports for the Reich, Michaelis demanded access in Dalmatia from the Austrians, as well as those on the Belgian coast. Through the vehicle of Mitteleuropa he sought to enable the Austrian economy to withstand the peace conditions he knew would be imposed on the German customs union.

But the candidate chosen as the new Chancellor was the Army's and not that of the Reichstag. "We have lost a statesman and secured a functionary in his place", remarked Conrad Haussmann, a member of the Reichstag from the Progressive People's Party.

=== Decline ===
In August, the naval mutinies at Wilhelmshaven led to executions. Michaelis blamed the socialists in the Reichstag hoping to split the coalition. But the Reichstag demanded his resignation. On 24 October 1917 the National Liberals three socialist parties in the coalition made representations to the Kaiser. In his autobiography he laid the blame on his own refusal to bend to pressure for liberal electoral reforms. The deputies hoped to replace him with a Centre Party aristocrat, Georg von Hertling.

He remained in this position until 1 November 1917, when he was forced to resign after coming under fire for refusing to commit himself by endorsing a resolution passed by the Reichstag favouring peace without annexation or indemnities. Michaelis attempted to retain his role as Prussian Minister President, but without success as Count Hertling was determined that the two posts could not be separated.

=== Late life and death ===
From 1 April 1918 to 31 March 1919 he served as Oberpräsident of the Prussian province of Pomerania. After the end of World War I, he cooperated with the local workers' and soldiers' council. Nevertheless, the socialist-dominated government of Prussia soon replaced him.

Michaelis worked in the fields of economic lobbying, in student organizations, in the synod of the Evangelical Church of the old-Prussian Union and became a member of the monarchist/national conservative German National People's Party (DNVP). In 1921, he published his memoirs, Für Staat und Volk. Eine Lebensgeschichte (For State and People. A Life Story).

Georg Michaelis died on 24 July 1936 in Bad Saarow-Pieskow (Brandenburg) at the age of 78.

== Works ==
- Michaelis, Georg (1890). History of Economics (in Japanese) (Japanese ed.). Hakubunkan. doi:10.11501/799103 – via National Diet Library.

== See also ==
- Michaelis cabinet (Prussia)
- Vienna Conference (August 1, 1917)
- Vienna Conference (October 22, 1917)
- Vienna Conference (March 16, 1917)

== Sources ==
- Chisholm, Hugh, ed. (1922). "Michaelis, Georg" . Encyclopædia Britannica (12th ed.). London & New York: The Encyclopædia Britannica Company.
- Balfour, Michael (1969). The Kaiser and His Times.
- Fischer, Fritz (1967). Germany's Aims in the First World War. New York: W.W. Norton. ISBN 9780393053470.
- Hanssen. Diary of a Dying Empire.
- Hord, Daniel, ed. (1969). The Private War of Seaman Stumpf. London.
- Kitchen, Martin (1976). The Silent Dictatorship: The Politics of the High Command under Hindenburg and Ludendorff 1916-1918. London: Holmes & Meier Publishers. ISBN 978-0841902770.
- Michaelis, Georg (1922). Für Staat und Volk : Eine Lebensgeschichte [For State and People : A Life Story] (in German). Tübigen: Furche-Verlag.
- Strachan, Hew (2003). First World War. London: Penguin Books.
- Volksmann.

Political offices
Preceded by Theobald von Bethmann Hollweg	Chancellor of Germany; 1917	Succeeded by Georg Graf von Hertling
Preceded by Theobald von Bethmann Hollweg	Prime Minister of Prussia; 1917	Succeeded by Georg Graf von Hertling
