= History of Austria-Hungary during World War I =

World War I began when Austria-Hungary invaded Serbia in July 1914, following the Assassination of Archduke Franz Ferdinand by Gavrilo Princip. Austria-Hungary was one of the Central Powers, along with the German Empire and the Ottoman Empire. Austro-Hungarian forces fought the Allies in Serbia, on the Eastern Front, in Italy, and in Romania. With heavy aid and support from its allies, the empire managed to occupy Serbia in 1915 and force Romania out of the war in 1917. On the other fronts, it suffered severe casualties, culminating in the collapse of the Italian front, which led the Austrians to accept the Armistice of Villa Giusti on 3 November 1918.

== Prelude ==
=== Sarajevo assassination ===
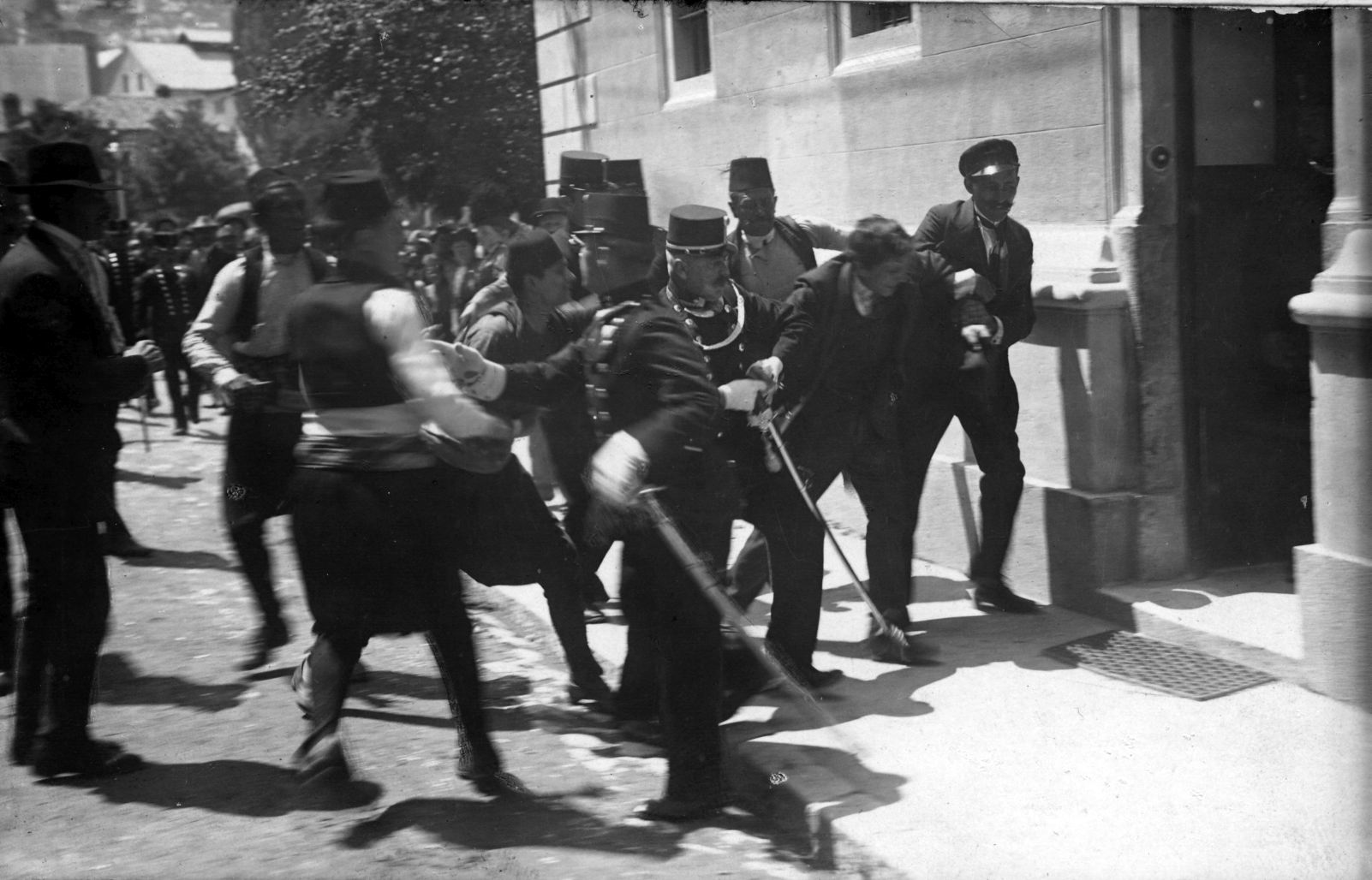
This picture of the arrest of a suspect in Sarajevo is usually associated with the capture of Gavrilo Princip, although some believe it depicts Ferdinand Behr, a bystander.

On 28 June 1914, Archduke Franz Ferdinand visited Sarajevo, the capital of the Condominium of Bosnia and Herzegovina (which had been annexed by Austria-Hungary in 1908). A group of six assassins (Cvjetko Popović, Gavrilo Princip, Muhamed Mehmedbašić, Nedeljko Čabrinović, Trifko Grabež, Vaso Čubrilović) from the nationalist group Mlada Bosna, supplied by the Black Hand, had gathered on the street where the Archduke's motorcade would pass. Čabrinović threw a grenade at the car, but missed. It injured some people nearby, and Franz Ferdinand's convoy could carry on. The other assassins failed to act as the cars drove past them quickly. About an hour later, when Franz Ferdinand was returning from a visit at the Sarajevo Hospital, the convoy took a wrong turn into a street where Gavrilo Princip by coincidence stood. With a pistol, Princip shot and killed Franz Ferdinand and his wife Sophie. The reaction among the Austrian people was mild, almost indifferent. As historian Z. A. B. Zeman later wrote, "the event almost failed to make any impression whatsoever. On Sunday and Monday [June 28 and 29], the crowds in Vienna listened to music and drank wine, as if nothing had happened."

=== Escalation of violence in Bosnia ===
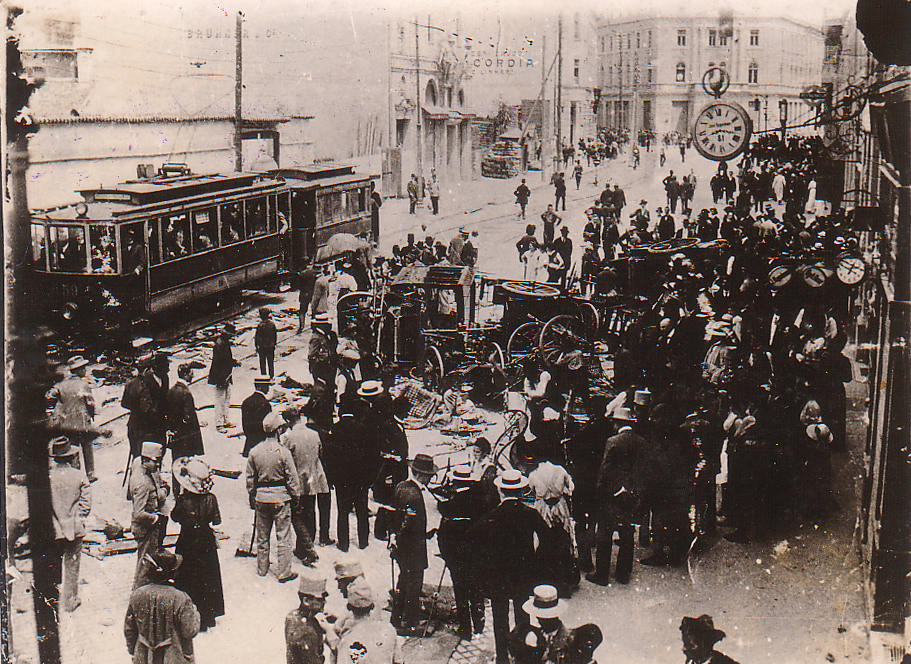
Crowds on the streets in the aftermath of the Anti-Serb riots in Sarajevo, 29 June 1914

The assassination excessively intensified the existing traditional religion-based ethnic hostilities in Bosnia. However, in Sarajevo itself, Austrian authorities encouraged violence against the Serb residents, which resulted in the Anti-Serb riots of Sarajevo, in which Catholic Croats and Bosnian Muslims killed two and damaged numerous Serb-owned buildings. Writer Ivo Andrić referred to the violence as the "Sarajevo frenzy of hate." Violent actions against ethnic Serbs were organized not only in Sarajevo but also in many other larger Austro-Hungarian cities in modern-day Croatia and Bosnia and Herzegovina. Austro-Hungarian authorities in Bosnia and Herzegovina imprisoned and extradited approximately 5,500 prominent Serbs, 700 to 2,200 of whom died in prison. 460 Serbs were sentenced to death and a predominantly Muslim special militia known as the Schutzkorps was established and carried out the persecution of Serbs.

=== Decision for war ===
While the empire's military spending had not even doubled since the 1878 Congress of Berlin, Germany's spending had risen five-fold, and the British, Russian, and French expenditures threefold. The empire had lost ethnic Italian areas to Piedmont, and many Austro-Hungarians perceived as imminent the threat of losing to Serbia the southern territories inhabited by South Slavs. Serbia had recently gained considerable territory in the Second Balkan War of 1913, causing much distress in government circles in Vienna and Budapest. Former ambassador and foreign minister Count Alois Aehrenthal had assumed that any future war would be in the Balkan region.

Hungarian prime minister and political scientist István Tisza opposed the expansion of the monarchy in the Balkans (see Bosnian crisis in 1908) because "the Dual Monarchy already had too many Slavs", which would further threaten the integrity of the Dual Monarchy. In March 1914, Tisza wrote a memorandum to Emperor Franz Joseph with a strongly apocalyptic, predictive and embittered tone. He used the hitherto unknown word "Weltkrieg" (meaning World War). "It is my firm conviction that Germany's two neighbors [Russia and France] are carefully proceeding with military preparations, but will not start the war so long as they have not attained a grouping of the Balkan states against us that confronts the monarchy with an attack from three sides and pins down the majority of our forces on our eastern and southern front."

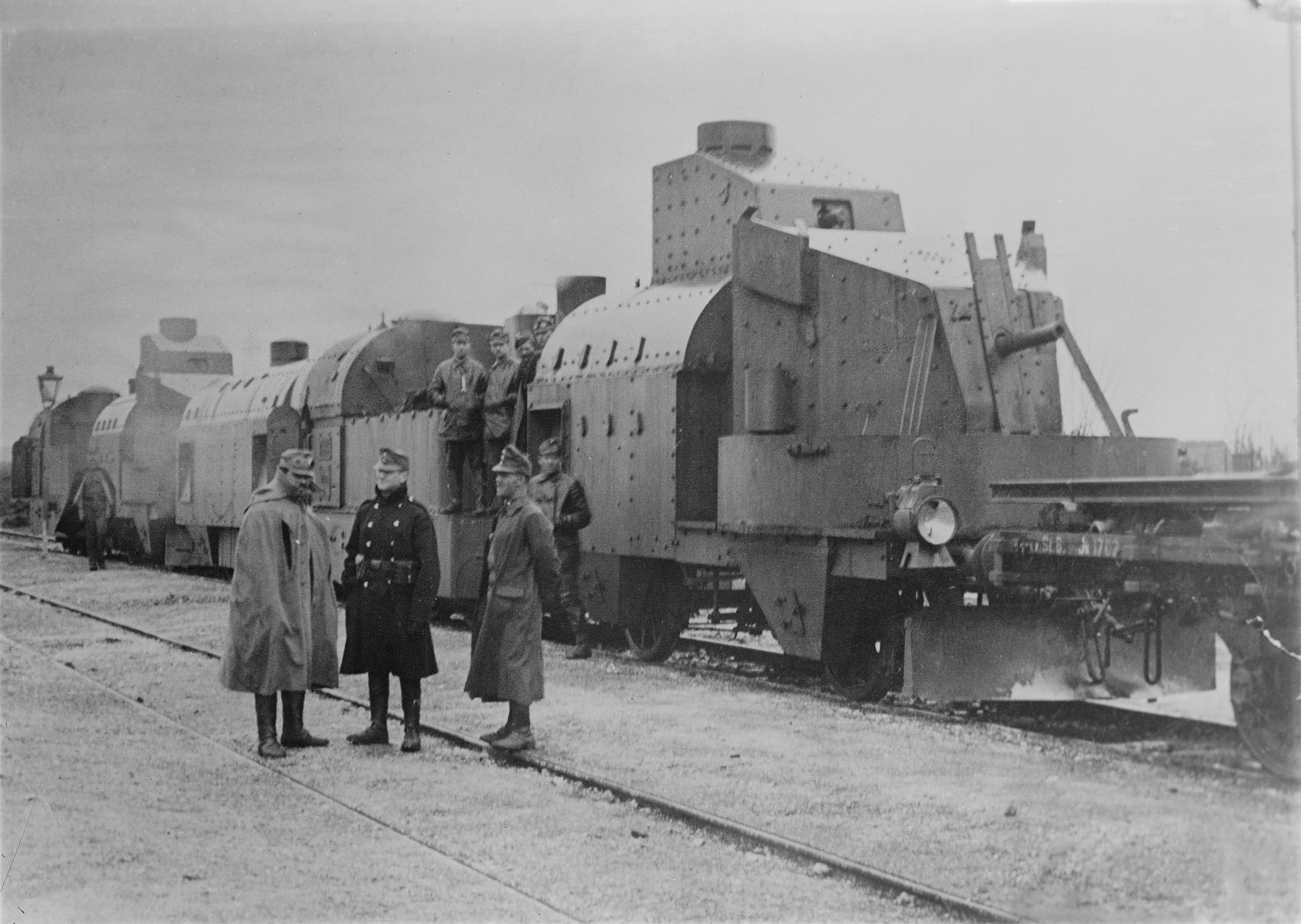
MÁVAG armoured train in 1914

On the day of the assassination of Archduke Franz Ferdinand, Tisza immediately traveled to Vienna where he met Minister of Foreign Affairs Count Leopold Berchtold and Army Commander Count Franz Conrad von Hötzendorf. They proposed to solve the dispute with arms, attacking Serbia. Tisza proposed to give the government of Serbia time to take a stand as to whether it was involved in the organisation of the murder and proposed a peaceful resolution, arguing that the international situation would settle soon. Returning to Budapest, he wrote to Emperor Franz Joseph saying he would not take any responsibility for the armed conflict because there was no proof that Serbia had plotted the assassination. Tisza opposed a war with Serbia, stating (correctly, as it turned out) that any war with the Serbs was bound to trigger a war with Russia and hence a general European war. He did not trust in the Italian alliance, due to the political aftermath of the Second Italian War of Independence. He thought that even a successful Austro-Hungarian war would be disastrous for the integrity of Kingdom of Hungary, where Hungary would be the next victim of Austrian politics. After a successful war against Serbia, Tisza foresaw a possible Austrian military attack against the Kingdom of Hungary, where the Austrians want to break up the territory of Hungary.

Some members of the government, such as Count Franz Conrad von Hötzendorf, had wanted to confront the resurgent Serbian nation for some years in a preventive war, but the Emperor, 84 years old and an enemy of all adventures, disapproved.

The foreign ministry of Austro-Hungarian Empire sent ambassador László Szőgyény to Potsdam, where he inquired about the standpoint of the German Emperor on 5 July. Szőgyény described what happened in a secret report to Vienna later that day:

I presented His Majesty [Wilhelm] with [Franz Joseph's] letter and the attached memorandum. The Kaiser read both papers quite carefully in my presence. First, His Majesty assured me that he had expected us to take firm action against Serbia, but he had to concede that, as a result of the conflicts facing [Franz Joseph], he needed to take into account a serious complication in Europe, which is why he did not wish to give any definite answer prior to consultations with the chancellor....

When, after our déjeuner, I once again emphasized the gravity of the situation, His Majesty authorized me to report to [Franz Joseph] that in this case, too, we could count on Germany's full support. As mentioned, he first had to consult with the Chancellor, but he did not have the slightest doubt that Herr von Bethmann Hollweg would fully agree with him, particularly with regard to action on our part against Serbia. In his [Wilhelm's] opinion, though, there was no need to wait patiently before taking action.

The Kaiser said that Russia's stance would always be a hostile one, but he had been prepared for this for many years, and even if war broke out between Austria–Hungary and Russia, we could rest assured that Germany would take our side, in line with its customary loyalty. According to the Kaiser, as things stood now, Russia was not at all ready for war. It would certainly have to think hard before making a call to arms.

But now the leaders of Austria–Hungary, especially General Count Leopold von Berchtold, backed by its ally Germany, decided to confront Serbia militarily before it could incite a revolt; using the assassination as an excuse, they presented a list of ten demands called the July Ultimatum, expecting Serbia would never accept. When Serbia accepted nine of the ten demands but only partially accepted the remaining one, Austria–Hungary declared war. Franz Joseph I finally followed the urgent counsel of his top advisers.

Over the course of July and August 1914, these events caused the start of World War I, as Russia mobilized in support of Serbia, setting off a series of counter-mobilizations. In support of his German ally, on Thursday, 6 August 1914, Emperor Franz Joseph signed the declaration of war on Russia. Italy initially remained neutral, although it had an alliance with Austria–Hungary. In 1915, it switched to the side of the Entente powers, hoping to gain territory from its former ally.

== Wartime foreign policy ==
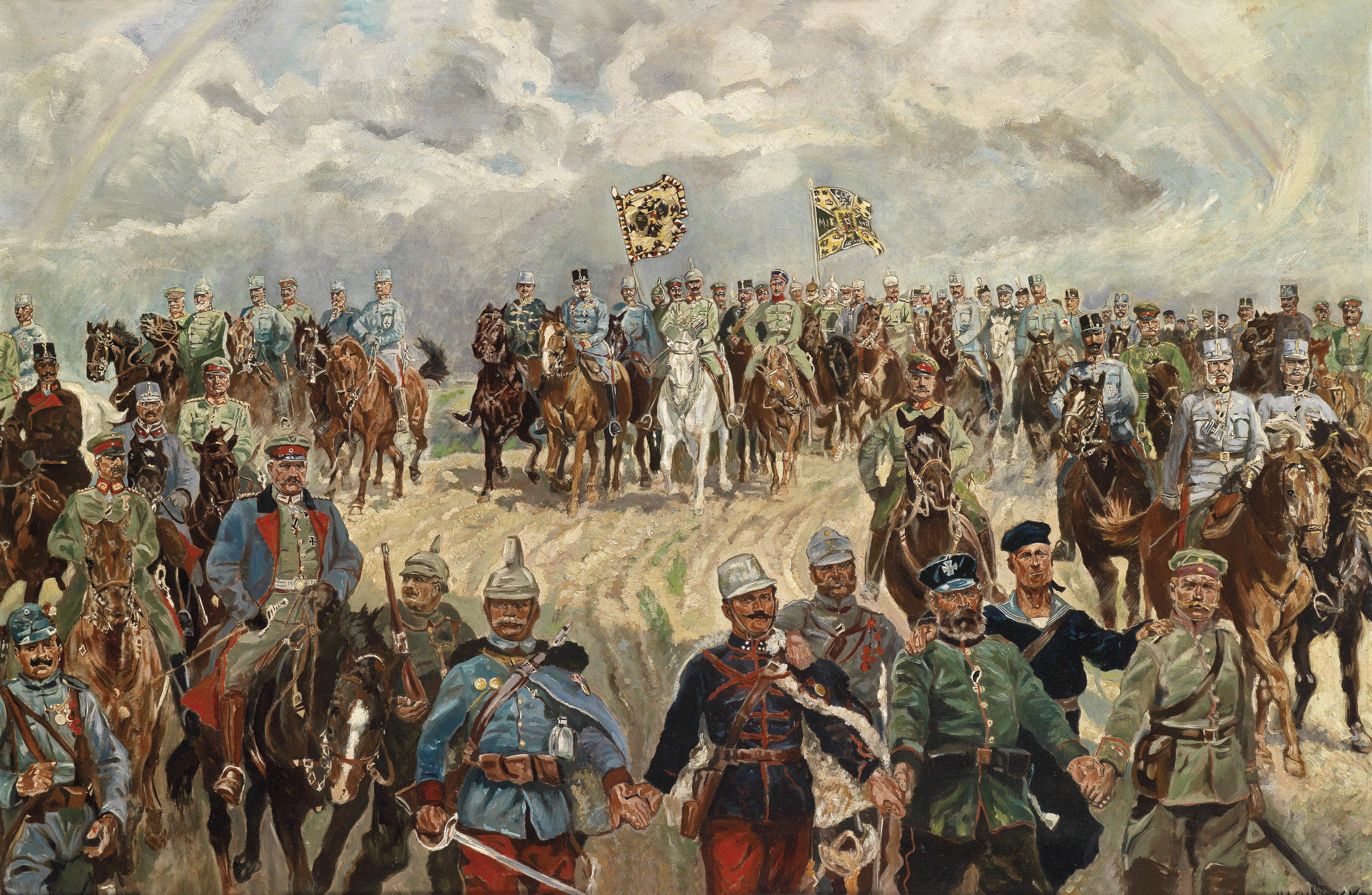
Franz Josef I and Wilhelm II with military commanders during World War I

The Austro-Hungarian Empire played a relatively passive diplomatic role in the war, as it was increasingly dominated and controlled by Germany. The only goal was to punish Serbia and try to stop the ethnic breakup of the Empire, and it completely failed. Starting in late 1916 the new Emperor Karl removed the pro-German officials and opened peace overtures to the Allies, whereby the entire war could be ended by compromise, or perhaps Austria would make a separate peace from Germany. The main effort was vetoed by Italy, which had been promised large slices of Austria for joining the Allies in 1915. Austria was only willing to turn over the Trentino region but nothing more. Karl was seen as a defeatist, which weakened his standing at home and with both the Allies and Germany.

== Organisation of Austro-Hungarian army ==
The Austro-Hungarian Empire conscripted 7.8 million soldiers during WWI.

At the outbreak of war, the Austro-Hungarian army had 48 infantry divisions (including seven Landwehr and eight Honved) and eleven cavalry divisions (of which two were Honved).

The Austro-Hungarian infantry division numbered between 12,000 and 18,000 men, while the cavalry divisions averaged 5,000 fewer soldiers. Each division had a brigade of artillery (with 54 guns, but few divisions had that many guns) and two brigades of infantry or cavalry; with two regiments of infantry or cavalry per brigade. Each regiment of infantry had 4 battalions of 1,100 men at full strength, although, in practice, many regiments deployed with just three battalions. Each cavalry regiment had two divisions (a battalion-sized unit) of about 700 each.

In 1914, the Austro-Hungarian division had less artillery than most other European divisions, save the Italian. The German division had as many as 72 pieces, the Russian sixty.

General von Hötzendorf was the Chief of the Austro-Hungarian General Staff. Franz Joseph I, who was much too old to command the army, appointed Archduke Friedrich von Österreich-Teschen as Supreme Army Commander (Armeeoberkommandant), but asked him to give Von Hötzendorf freedom to take any decisions. Von Hötzendorf remained in effective command of the military forces until Emperor Karl I took the supreme command himself in late 1916 and dismissed Conrad von Hötzendorf in 1917.

=== Home front ===
While the largely rural Empire did have a modest industrial base, its most significant contribution to the central powers was manpower and food. Nevertheless, Austria–Hungary was more urbanized (25%) than its actual opponents in the First World War, like the Russian Empire (13.4%), Serbia (13.2%) or Romania (18.8%). Furthermore, the Austro-Hungarian Empire had a more industrialized economy overall and a higher GDP per capita than the Kingdom of Italy, which was by far the most economically developed actual opponent of the Empire.

Meanwhile, as the war dragged on, economic conditions on the homefront deteriorated rapidly. The Empire depended on agriculture, and agriculture depended on the heavy labor of millions of men who were now in the Army. Food production fell, the transportation system became overcrowded, and industrial production could not successfully handle the overwhelming need for munitions. Germany provided a great deal of help, but it was not enough. Furthermore, the political instability of the multiple ethnic groups of Empire now ripped apart any hope for national consensus in support of the war. Increasingly there was a demand for breaking up the Empire and setting up autonomous national states based on historic language-based cultures. The new Emperor Karl sought peace terms from the Allies, but his initiatives were vetoed by Italy.

On the home front, food grew scarcer and scarcer, as did heating fuel. Hungary, with its heavy agricultural base, was somewhat better fed. The Army conquered productive agricultural areas in Romania and elsewhere, but refused to allow food shipments to civilians back home. Morale fell every year, and the diverse nationalities gave up on the Empire and looked for ways to establish their own nation states.

Inflation soared, from an index of 129 in 1914 to 1589 in 1918, wiping out the cash savings of the middle-class. In terms of war damage to the economy, the war used up about 20 percent of the GDP. The dead soldiers amounted to about four percent of the 1914 labor force, and the wounded ones to another six percent. Compared to all the major countries in the war, the death and casualty rate was toward the high-end regarding the present-day territory of Austria.

By summer 1918, "Green Cadres" of army deserters formed armed bands in the hills of Croatia-Slavonia and civil authority disintegrated. By late October violence and massive looting erupted and there were efforts to form peasant republics. However, the Croatian political leadership was focused on creating a new state (Yugoslavia) and worked with the advancing Serbian army to impose control and end the uprisings.

== Theaters of operations ==
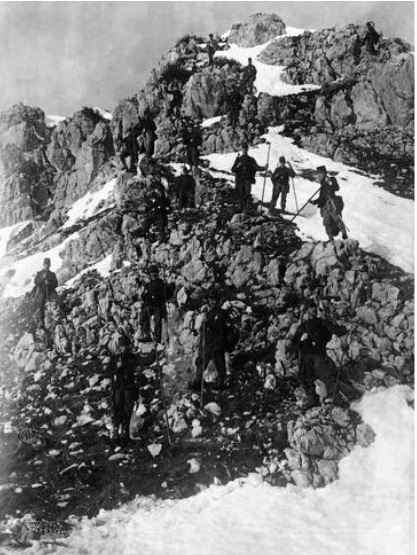
Austro-Hungarian Alpine troops navigate Carpathian mountain passes during a battle against Russian forces 1915

=== Serbian front 1914–1916 ===
At the start of the war, the army was divided into two: the smaller part attacked Serbia while the larger part fought against the formidable Imperial Russian Army. The invasion of Serbia in 1914 was a disaster: by the end of the year, the Austro-Hungarian Army had taken no territory, but had lost 227,000 out of a total force of 450,000 men. However, in the autumn of 1915, the Serbian Army was defeated by the Central Powers, which led to the occupation of Serbia. Near the end of 1915, in a massive rescue operation involving more than 1,000 trips made by Italian, French and British steamers, 260,000 Serb surviving soldiers were transported to Brindisi and Corfu, where they waited for the chance of the victory of Allied Powers to reclaim their country. Corfu hosted the Serbian government in exile after the collapse of Serbia and served as a supply base to the Greek front. In April 1916 a large number of Serbian troops were transported in British and French naval vessels from Corfu to mainland Greece. The contingent numbering over 120,000 relieved a much smaller army at the Macedonian front and fought alongside British and French troops.

=== Russian front 1914–1917 ===
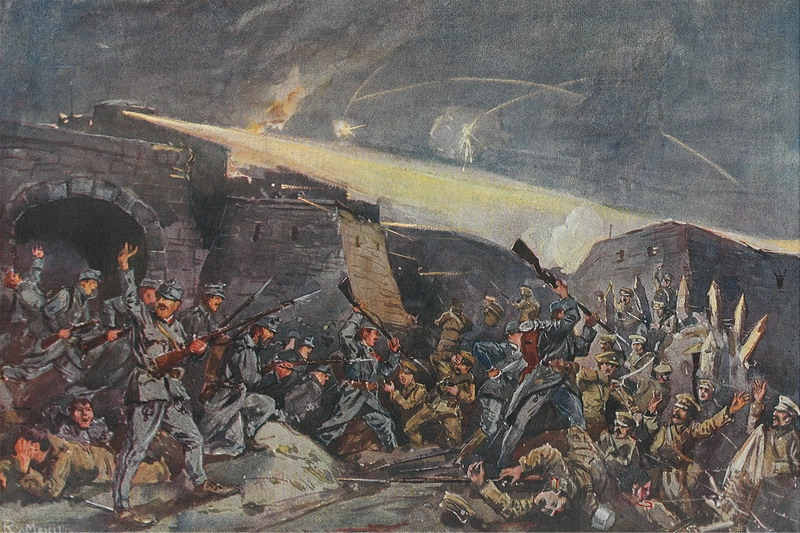
Siege of Przemyśl in 1915

On the Eastern front, the war started out equally poorly. The government accepted the Polish proposal of establishing the Supreme National Committee as the Polish central authority within the Empire, responsible for the formation of the Polish Legions, an auxiliary military formation within the Austro-Hungarian army. The Austro-Hungarian Army was defeated at the Battle of Lemberg and the great fortress city of Przemyśl was besieged and fell in March 1915. The Gorlice–Tarnów Offensive started as a minor German offensive to relieve the pressure of the Russian numerical superiority on the Austro-Hungarians, but the cooperation of the Central Powers resulted in huge Russian losses and the total collapse of the Russian lines and their 100 km (62 mi) long retreat into Russia. The Russian Third Army perished. In summer 1915, the Austro-Hungarian Army, under a unified command with the Germans, participated in the successful Gorlice–Tarnów Offensive. From June 1916, the Russians focused their attacks on the Austro-Hungarian army in the Brusilov Offensive, recognizing the numerical inferiority of the Austro-Hungarian army. By the end of September 1916, Austria–Hungary mobilized and concentrated new divisions, and the successful Russian advance was halted and slowly repelled; but the Austrian armies took heavy losses (about 1 million men) and never recovered. Nevertheless, the huge losses in men and material inflicted on the Russians during the offensive contributed greatly to the revolutions of 1917, and it caused an economic crash in the Russian Empire.

The Act of 5 November 1916 was proclaimed then to the Poles jointly by the Emperors Wilhelm II of Germany and Franz Joseph of Austria-Hungary. This act promised the creation of the Kingdom of Poland out of territory of Congress Poland, envisioned by its authors as a puppet state controlled by the Central Powers, with the nominal authority vested in the Regency Council. The origin of that document was the dire need to draft new recruits from German-occupied Poland for the war with Russia. Following the Armistice of 11 November 1918 ending the World War I, in spite of the previous initial total dependence of the kingdom on its sponsors, it ultimately served against their intentions as the cornerstone proto state of the nascent Second Polish Republic, the latter composed also of territories never intended by the Central Powers to be ceded to Poland.

The Battle of Zborov (1917) was the first significant action of the Czechoslovak Legions, who fought for the independence of Czechoslovakia against the Austro-Hungarian army.

=== Italian front 1915–1918 ===
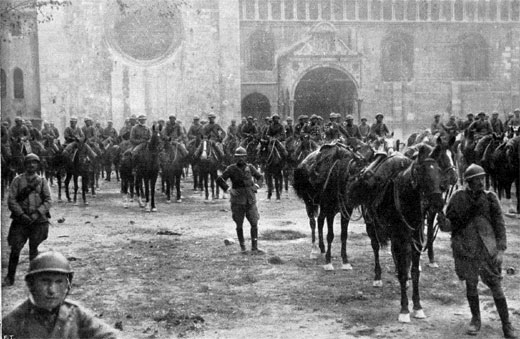
Italian troops in Trento on 3 November 1918, after the Battle of Vittorio Veneto. Italy's victory marked the end of the war on the Italian Front and secured the dissolution of Austria–Hungary.

In May 1915, Italy attacked Austria–Hungary. Italy was the only military opponent of Austria–Hungary which had a similar degree of industrialization and economic level; moreover, her army was numerous (≈1,000,000 men were immediately fielded), but suffered from poor leadership, training and organization. Chief of Staff Luigi Cadorna marched his army towards the Isonzo river, hoping to seize Ljubljana, and to eventually threaten Vienna. However, the Royal Italian Army were halted on the river, where four battles took place over five months (23 June – 2 December 1915). The fight was extremely bloody and exhausting for both sides.

On 15 May 1916, the Austrian Chief of Staff Conrad von Hötzendorf launched the Strafexpedition ("punitive expedition"): the Austrians broke through the opposing front and occupied the Asiago plateau. The Italians managed to resist and in a counteroffensive seized Gorizia on 9 August. Nonetheless, they had to stop on the Carso, a few kilometres away from the border. At this point, several months of indecisive trench warfare ensued (analogous to the Western Front). As the Russian Empire collapsed as a result of the Bolshevik Revolution and Russians ended their involvement in the war, Germans and Austrians moved on the Western and Southern fronts much manpower from the erstwhile-Eastern fighting.

On 24 October 1917, Austrians, now enjoying decisive German support, attacked at Caporetto by using new infiltration tactics; although they advanced more than 100 km (62.14 mi) in the direction of Venice and gained considerable supplies, they were halted and could not cross the Piave River. Italy, although suffering massive casualties, recovered from the blow, and a coalition government under Vittorio Emanuele Orlando was formed. Italy also enjoyed support by the Entente powers: by 1918, large amounts of war materials and a few auxiliary American, British, and French divisions arrived in the Italian battle zone. Cadorna was replaced by General Armando Diaz; under his command, the Italians retook the initiative and won the decisive Battle of the Piave River (15–23 June 1918) in which some 60,000 Austrian and 43,000 Italian soldiers were killed. The final battle was at Vittorio Veneto.

After four days of stiff resistance, Italian troops crossed the Piave River, and after losing 90,000 men, the defeated Austrian troops retreated in disarray pursued by the Italians. The Italians captured 448,000 Austrian-Hungarian soldiers (about one third of the Austro-Hungarian Army), 24 of whom were generals, 5,600 cannons and mortars, and 4,000 machine guns. The armistice was signed at Villa Giusti on 3 November, in spite of Austria–Hungary already having disintegrated on 31 October 1918.

=== Romanian front 1916–1917 ===
On 27 August 1916, Romania declared war against Austria–Hungary. The Romanian Army crossed the borders of Eastern Hungary (Transylvania).

After a short Romanian initial success, the campaign turned into a military disaster for Romania. After three months of war, two thirds of the territory of the Kingdom of Romania were occupied by the Central Powers. Bucharest, the capital city of Romania, was captured by the Central Powers on 6 December 1916. German General August von Mackensen was appointed as the "military governor" of the occupied territories of Romania. A part of the Romanian population moved to the unoccupied Romanian territory, in Moldavia, together with the Romanian government, royal court and public authorities, which relocated to Iași. Following Russia's ceasefire agreements, the Romanian army was forced to sign the Armistice of Focșani on 9 December 1917.

On 7 May 1918, Romania sued for peace. Romanian Prime Minister Alexandru Marghiloman signed the Treaty of Bucharest (1918) with the Central Powers, but the treaty was never signed by King Ferdinand I of Romania.

Whereas the German army realized it needed close cooperation from the homefront, Habsburg officers saw themselves as entirely separate from the civilian world, and superior to it. When they occupied productive areas, such as southern Romania, they seized food stocks and other supplies for their own purposes and blocked any shipments intended for civilians back in Austria-Hungary. The result was that the officers lived well, as the civilians began to starve. Vienna even transferred training units to Serbia and Poland for the sole purpose of feeding them. In all, the Army obtained about 15 percent of its cereal needs from occupied territories.

== Atrocities ==
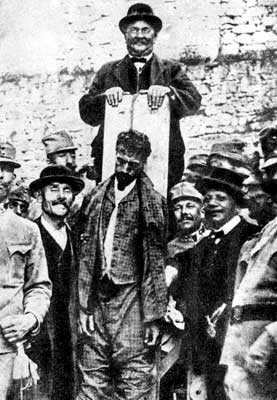
This image was used in the work The Last Days of Mankind by Karl Kraus, which has been described as the Austrian national drama, symbolic for the oppression in Austria, particular towards non-german people. Depicted is the irredentist Reichsrat and provincial assembly deputy Cesare Battisti after his execution by the for Austria typical garrote (1916) in the moat of the Castle of Trento, together with the infamous executioner Josef Lang.

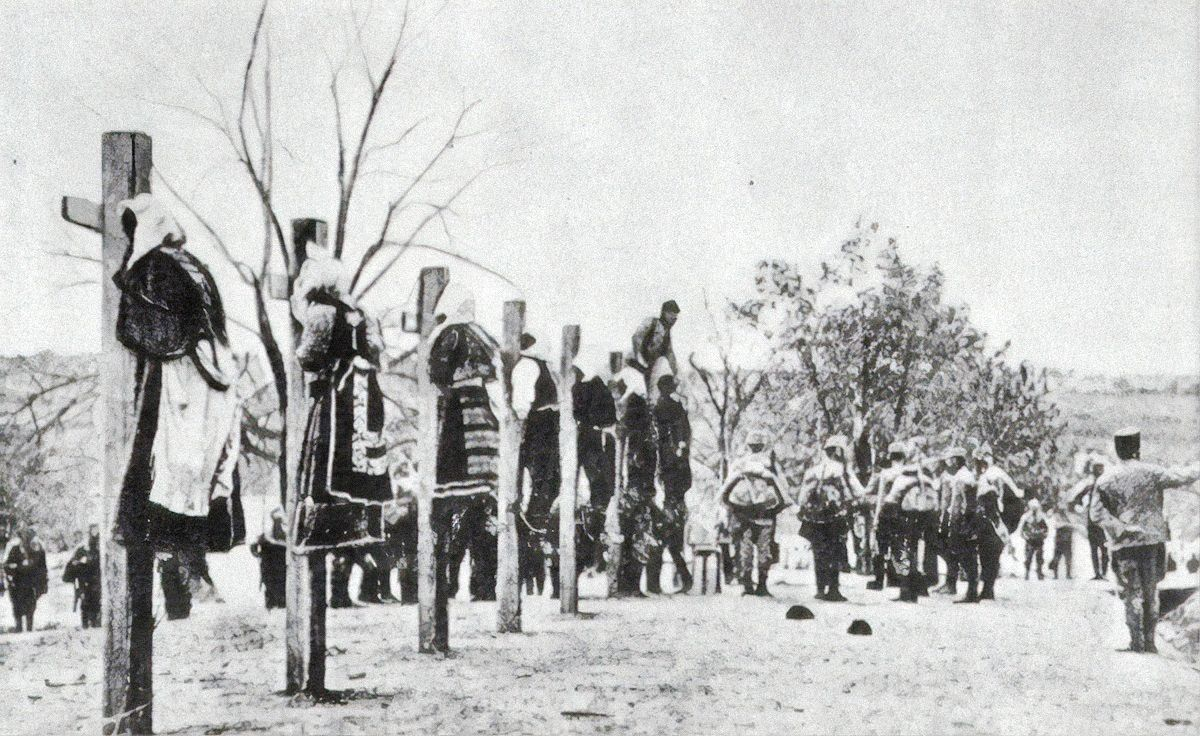
Serbian women and men (civilians) executed in Šabac

Austrian military deported and killed thousands of civilians, particularly Galicians, deported to the Thalerhof internment camp.

== Role of Hungary ==
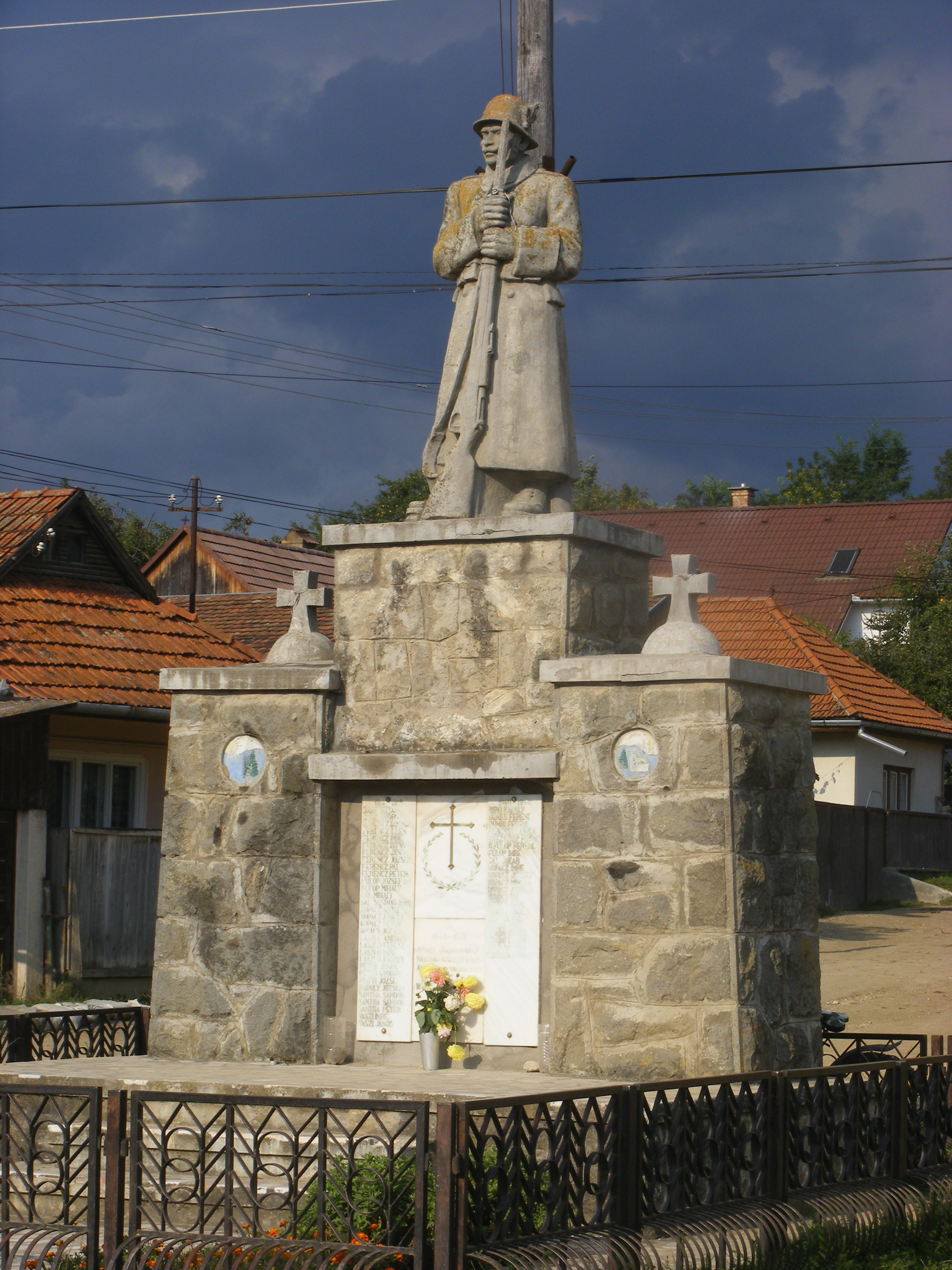
War memorial in Păuleni-Ciuc, Romania

Although the Kingdom of Hungary comprised only 42% of the population of Austria–Hungary, the thin majority – more than 3.8 million soldiers – of the Austro-Hungarian armed forces were conscripted from the Kingdom of Hungary during the First World War. Roughly 600,000 soldiers were killed in action, and 700,000 soldiers were wounded in the war.

Austria–Hungary held on for years, as the Hungarian half provided sufficient supplies for the military to continue to wage war. This was shown in a transition of power after which the Hungarian prime minister, Count István Tisza, and foreign minister, Count István Burián, had decisive influence over the internal and external affairs of the monarchy. By late 1916, food supply from Hungary became intermittent and the government sought an armistice with the Entente powers. However, this failed as Britain and France no longer had any regard for the integrity of the monarchy because of Austro-Hungarian support for Germany.

== Analysis of defeat ==
The setbacks that the Austrian army suffered in 1914 and 1915 can be attributed to a large extent by the incompetence of the Austrian high command. After attacking Serbia, its forces soon had to be withdrawn to protect its eastern frontier against Russia's invasion, while German units were engaged in fighting on the Western Front. This resulted in a greater than expected loss of men in the invasion of Serbia. Furthermore, it became evident that the Austrian high command had no plans for possible continental war and that the army and navy were also ill-equipped to handle such a conflict.

In the last two years of the war, the Austro-Hungarian armed forces lost all ability to act independently of Germany. As of 7 September 1916, the German emperor was given full control of all the armed forces of the Central Powers and Austria-Hungary effectively became a satellite of Germany. For the first half of the war, the Austrians viewed the German army favorably; however by 1916, the general belief in the German Empire was that it, in its alliance with Austria–Hungary, was "shackled to a corpse". The operational capability of the Austro-Hungarian army was seriously affected by supply shortages, low morale and a high casualty rate, and by the army's composition of multiple ethnicities with different languages and customs.

The last two successes for the Austrians, the Romanian Offensive and the Caporetto Offensive, were German-assisted operations. As the Dual Monarchy became more politically unstable, it became more and more dependent on German assistance. The majority of its people, other than Hungarians and German Austrians, became increasingly restless.

In 1917, the Eastern front of the Entente Powers completely collapsed. In spite of this, the Austro-Hungarian Empire then withdrew from all defeated countries due to its dire economic condition, as well as signs of impending disintegration.

== Demise, disintegration, dissolution ==
=== Demise ===
By 1918, the economic situation had deteriorated. The government had failed badly on the homefront. Historian Alexander Watson reports:

across central Europe ... The majority lived in a state of advanced misery by the spring of 1918, and conditions later worsened, for the summer of 1918 saw both the drop in food supplied to the levels of the 'turnip winter', and the onset of the 1918 flu pandemic that killed at least 20 million worldwide. Society was relieved, exhausted and yearned for peace.

As the Imperial economy collapsed into severe hardship and even starvation, its multi-ethnic army lost its morale and was increasingly hard-pressed to hold its line. At the last Italian offensive, the Austro-Hungarian Army took to the field without any food and munition supply and fought without any political supports for a de facto non-existent empire.

The Austro-Hungarian monarchy collapsed with dramatic speed in the autumn of 1918. Leftist and pacifist political movements organized strikes in factories, and uprisings in the army had become commonplace. These leftist or left-liberal pro-Entente maverick parties opposed the monarchy as a form of government and considered themselves internationalist rather than patriotic. Eventually, the German defeat and the minor revolutions in Vienna and Budapest gave political power to the left/liberal political parties.

=== Disintegration ===
As the war went on, the ethnic unity declined; the Allies encouraged breakaway demands from minorities and the Empire faced disintegration. As it became apparent that the Allied powers would win World War I, nationalist movements, which had previously been calling for a greater degree of autonomy for various areas, started pressing for full independence. In the capital cities of Vienna and Budapest, the leftist and liberal movements and opposition parties strengthened and supported the separatism of ethnic minorities. The multiethnic Austro-Hungarian Empire started to disintegrate, leaving its army alone on the battlefields. The military breakdown of the Italian front marked the start of the rebellion for the numerous ethnicities who made up the multiethnic Empire, as they refused to keep on fighting for a cause that now appeared senseless. The Emperor had lost much of his power to rule, as his realm disintegrated.

As one of his Fourteen Points, President Woodrow Wilson demanded that the nationalities of Austria–Hungary have the "freest opportunity to autonomous development". In response, Emperor Karl I agreed to reconvene the Imperial Parliament in 1917 and allow the creation of a confederation with each national group exercising self-governance. However, the leaders of these national groups rejected the idea; they deeply distrusted Vienna and were now determined to get independence.

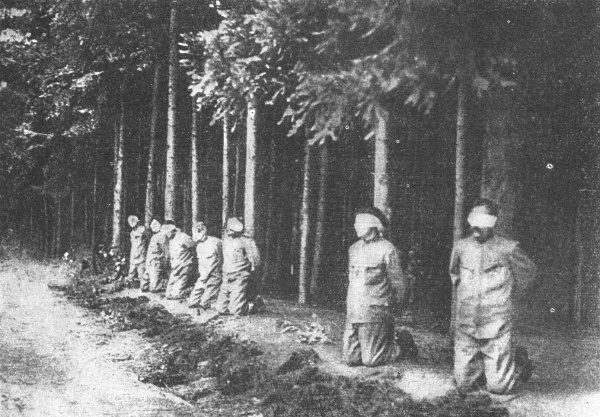
The revolt of ethnic Czech units in Austria in May 1918 was brutally suppressed. It was considered a mutiny by the code of military justice.

On 14 October 1918, Foreign Minister Baron István Burián von Rajecz asked for an armistice based on the Fourteen Points. In an apparent attempt to demonstrate good faith, Emperor Karl issued a proclamation ("Imperial Manifesto of 16 October 1918") two days later which would have significantly altered the structure of the Austrian half of the monarchy. The Polish majority regions of Lesser Poland and part of Galicia were to be granted the option of seceding from the empire to join the earlier established Polish proto-state, in order to reunite with their ethnic brethren in the Polish lands held by Russia and Germany, with the ultimate goal of resurrecting the sovereign Polish statehood. In fact, the Regency Council in Warsaw already adopted on 6 October Wilson's proposals as the basis for creating a Polish state. However, the imperial government attempted to curb the Polish ambitions by inciting the Polish-Ukrainian conflict through separating and retaining the remainder of Galicia and the entire Lodomeria, designated in the secret Treaty of Brest-Litovsk (Ukraine–Central Powers) for the purpose of creating a Ukrainian polity, intended in the proclamation to constitute along the rest of Cisleithania a transformed federal union composed of four parts—German, Czech, South Slav and Ukrainian. Each of these was to be governed by a national council that would negotiate the future of the empire with Vienna. Trieste was to receive a special status. No such proclamation could be issued in Hungary, where Hungarian aristocrats still believed they could subdue other nationalities and maintain the "Holy Kingdom of St. Stephen".

It was a dead letter. Four days later, on 18 October, United States Secretary of State Robert Lansing replied that the Allies were now committed to the causes of the Czechs, Slovaks and South Slavs. Therefore, Lansing said, autonomy for the nationalities – the tenth of the Fourteen Points – was no longer enough and Washington could not deal on the basis of the Fourteen Points anymore. In fact, a Czechoslovak provisional government had joined the Allies on 14 October. The South Slavs in both halves of the monarchy had already declared in favor of uniting with Serbia in a large South Slav state by way of the 1917 Corfu Declaration signed by members of the Yugoslav Committee. Indeed, the Croatians had begun disregarding orders from Budapest earlier in October. The Lansing note was, in effect, the death certificate of Austria–Hungary.

The national councils had already begun acting more or less as provisional governments of independent countries. During the Italian battles, the Czechoslovaks and Southern Slavs declared their independence. With defeat in the war imminent after the Italian offensive in the Battle of Vittorio Veneto on 24 October, Czech politicians peacefully took over command in Prague on 28 October (later declared the birthday of Czechoslovakia) and followed up in other major cities in the next few days. On 30 October, the Slovaks followed in Martin. On 29 October, the Slavs in both portions of what remained of Austria–Hungary proclaimed the State of Slovenes, Croats and Serbs. They also declared that their ultimate intention was to unite with Serbia and Montenegro in a large South Slav state. On the same day, the Czechs and Slovaks formally proclaimed the establishment of Czechoslovakia as an independent state.

=== Dissolution ===
Alexander Watson argues that, "The Habsburg regime's doom was sealed when Wilson's response to the note, sent two and a half weeks earlier [by the foreign minister Baron István Burián von Rajecz on 14 October 1918 ], arrived on 20 October." Wilson rejected the continuation of the dual monarchy as a negotiable possibility.

On 17 October 1918, the Hungarian Parliament voted in favour of terminating the union with Austria. The most prominent opponent of continued union with Austria, Count Mihály Károlyi, seized power in the Aster Revolution on 31 October. Charles was all but forced to appoint Károlyi as his Hungarian prime minister. One of Károlyi's first acts was to repudiate the compromise agreement on 31 October, effectively terminating the personal union with Austria and thus officially dissolving the Austro-Hungarian Monarchy state.

By the end of October, there was nothing left of the Habsburg realm but its majority-German Danubian and Alpine provinces, and Karl's authority was being challenged even there by the German-Austrian state council. Karl's last Austrian prime minister, Heinrich Lammasch, concluded that Karl's position was untenable. Lammasch persuaded Karl that the best course was to relinquish, at least temporarily, his right to exercise sovereign authority.

On 11 November, Karl issued a carefully worded proclamation in which he recognized the Austrian people's right to determine the form of the state and "relinquish(ed) every participation" in Austrian state affairs.

On the day after he announced his withdrawal from Austria's politics, the German-Austrian National Council proclaimed the Republic of German Austria. Károlyi followed suit on 16 November, proclaiming the Hungarian Democratic Republic.

== See also ==
- History of Germany during World War I
- Hungary in World War I
- Invasion of Serbia by Bulgaria during the First World War
- Salzburg Negotiations
- Vienna Conference (August 1, 1917)
- Vienna Conference (October 22, 1917)
- Vienna Conference (March 16, 1917)
- Spa Conferences (First World War)
- Spa Conference (29 September 1918)
