= Ottokar Czernin =

Czech diplomat and politician (1872–1932)

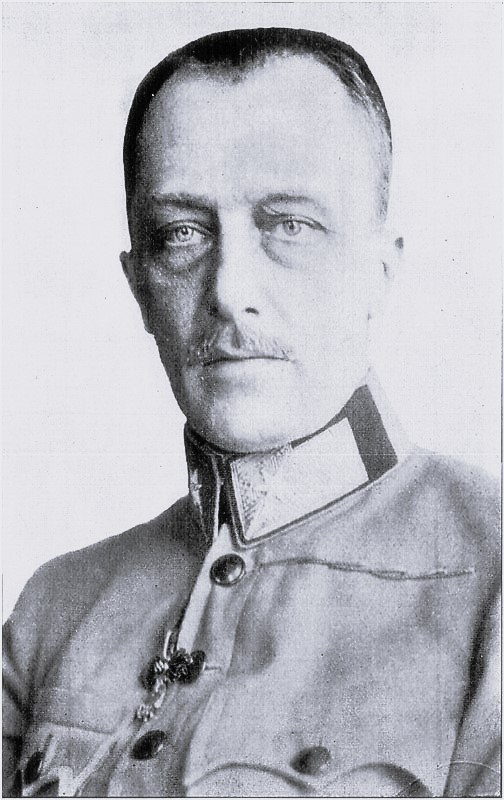

Imperial Foreign Minister of Austria-Hungary
- In office 23 December 1916 – 14 April 1918
- Preceded by: István Freiherr Burián von Rajecz
- Succeeded by: István Freiherr Burián von Rajecz

Austro-Hungarian Minister to Romania
- In office 25 October 1913 – 27 August 1916
- Preceded by: Karl Emil Prinz zu Fürstenberg
- Succeeded by: None

Personal details
- Born: 26 September 1872 Dimokur, Austria-Hungary (now Czech Republic)
- Died: 4 April 1932 (aged 59) Vienna, Austria
- Spouse(s): Marie, née Gräfin Kinsky von Wchinitz und Tettau (1878–1945)

Ottokar Theobald Otto Maria Graf Czernin von und zu Chudenitz (Czech: Otakar Theobald Otto Maria hrabě Černín z Chudenic; 26 September 1872 – 4 April 1932) was an Austro-Hungarian diplomat and politician during the time of World War I, notably serving as Foreign Minister from 1916 to 1918.

== Life and career ==
=== Family ===
Czernin was born in Dymokury (German: Dimokur) into an ancient Bohemian noble House of Czernin. In 1897, he married Countess Marie Kinsky von Wchinitz und Tettau (1878–1945) in Heřmanův Městec (German: Hermannstädtel). His younger brother Otto was also a diplomat and served inter alia as envoy to Sofia during World War I.

=== Early career ===
After studying law at the Charles-Ferdinand University in Prague, he joined the Austro-Hungarian foreign service in 1895 and was dispatched to the embassy in Paris. In 1899, he was sent to The Hague, but only three years later he had to resign as a result of a lung infection and retired to his Bohemian estates.

In 1903, Count von Czernin became a member of the Bohemian Lower House as a representative of the Deutsche Verfassungspartei. He quickly became a champion of conservatism and a defender of 'monarchical principles' and favoured upholding the monarchy and opposing universal suffrage and parliamentarism. This brought him to the attention of Archduke Franz Ferdinand, the heir apparent to the throne of the Dual Monarchy. As a leading member of Franz Ferdinand's so-called Belvedere Circle, Count von Czernin was appointed a member of the Austrian Upper House (Herrenhaus) in 1912.

=== Minister to Bucharest ===
At the heir apparent's request, Count von Czernin re-entered the diplomatic corps in October 1913 when he was selected as minister to Bucharest. The appointment initially caused some controversy as he was considered a notorious Magyarophobe, but he managed to persuade the Hungarian Minister President Count Tisza to agree. However, an interview in a Hungarian newspaper in January 1914 nearly cost him his job with Hungarian calls for his resignation.

As minister to Bucharest, Count von Czernin's mission was to investigate the value of the alliance with Romania and the possibilities to strengthen it. However, he quickly reported back to Vienna that one could not trust the Romanian government if a war were to break out. Following the outbreak of World War I in August 1914, he strove successfully to keep Romania neutral, thanks in part to the support of the aged King Carol I. Most Romanians did not share Carol's strongly pro-German sentiments, including Prime Minister Ion Brătianu and his government. Count von Czernin recommended that Vienna should offer the withdrawal of Siebenbürgen (now Transylvania) and parts of Bukovina in order to persuade Romania to prolong their neutrality, but the plan was strongly opposed by the Hungarian government. Romania entered the war on the side of the Allies in August 1916 and Count von Czernin returned to Vienna.

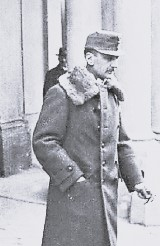
Count von Czernin at Laxenburg in 1918

=== Imperial Foreign Minister ===
Following the accession of Karl I as the new emperor, Count von Czernin was appointed Minister of Foreign Affairs on 23 December 1916, replacing Baron Burián von Rajecz. Both men shared the view that a rapid conclusion of peace was necessary to avoid the dissolution of the Habsburg Empire.

Count von Czernin's main aim was therefore to seek a compromise peace while respecting the agreements made with Germany. However, he quickly discovered that the Dual Monarchy's increasing dependency on Germany rendered a truly independent foreign policy impossible. While he reluctantly agreed with the necessity of resuming unrestricted submarine warfare in February 1917, he expended much effort that year unsuccessfully trying to persuade German political and military leaders of the need for a peace by compromise.

At a conference between Germany and Austria-Hungary on 17–18 March 1917 on the goals of the war, he suggested inter alia the cession of territory of the Central Powers to arrange a fast peace with the Entente. In his view, the declaration of war by the United States was a disaster and a victory for the Central Powers became improbable. More precisely, he suggested that Germany should abandon Alsace–Lorraine and Belgium in return for large territorial gains in Poland. In Count von Czernin's scenario Austria-Hungary would be compensated with primarily Romanian territory.

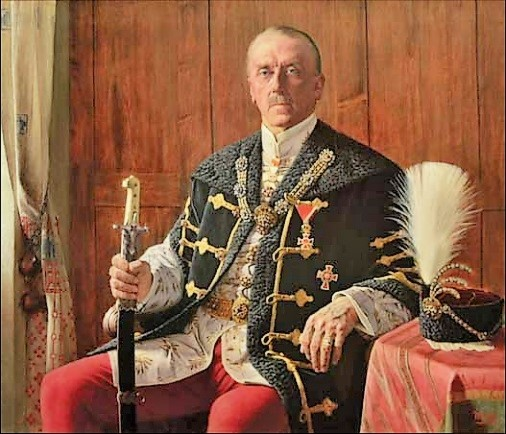
Von Czernin in his ambassadorial uniform. Portrait by Friedrich Miess

On 12 April, he drafted a memorandum with a gloomy prognostication of Austria-Hungary's war situation that was transmitted through Emperor Karl I to Matthias Erzberger, a member of the German Reichstag, outlining the reasons why the Dual Monarchy could not survive another winter of fighting. This resulted in the well-meaning but ineffective peace resolution of 19 July 1917. In a speech in Budapest on 2 October 1917, he spoke in favour of international justice, disarmament, arbitration and freedom of the seas as a basis for peace and as a legal basis for a new Europe.

Following the Bolshevik seizure of power in Russia, the workers across the Austro-Hungarian Empire became increasingly active around the issue of food shortages and a desire for a "peace without annexations". This led to the Austro-Hungarian strike of January 1918 in which Czernin had to personally intervene. On 24 January 1918, he announced he accepted Wilson's Fourteen Points. He then negotiated a separate peace treaty with the newly created Ukrainian People's Republic that was signed on 9 February 1918 and in which he agreed to cede Chełm. The so-called bread peace did not solve the Dual Monarchy's food supply problem, but it did earn Count von Czernin the loathing of Austrian Poles, who also had claimed Chełm. He reached the highlight of his career by subsequently signing peace treaties with Russia on 3 March and with Romania on 7 May and was considered the leading diplomat of the Central Powers.

The Sixtus Affair, however, led to Count von Czernin's downfall. Emperor Karl I, using his brother-in-law Prince Sixtus of Bourbon-Parma as his intermediary, had secretly assured French President Raymond Poincaré by a letter dated 24 March 1917 that he would support France's "just demand" for the return of Alsace-Lorraine. Although his role in the affair remains unclear, he was aware of the secret negotiations, although not of the exact wording of the letter. When French Premier Georges Clemenceau published the letter a year later Count von Czernin, feeling himself betrayed by Emperor Karl I and on the verge of a nervous breakdown, tendered his resignation on 14 April 1918.

Count von Czernin has been relatively harshly judged by historians. While he was arguably more imaginative and energetic than either of his predecessors, Count von Berchtold or Baron Burián von Rajecz, he was at the same time more unpredictable and volatile, giving in to sudden impulses. This gave his foreign policy an element of instability, which possibly did not inspire confidence to the other side with which he was seeking a compromise peace. Despite being celebrated at the time as a "peace minister", his diplomatic efforts to disengage his country from World War I failed to prevent the dissolution of Austria-Hungary.

=== Post-war career ===
After the war, the Czechoslovak agrarian reforms deprived him of his lands in Bohemia and he withdrew to Salzkammergut in Austria. From 1920 to 1923, he served as a deputy of the Demokratische Partei in the National Council of the Republic of Austria.

In 1917, he was bestowed with the Grand Cross of the Order of Saint Stephen and invested as a Knight of the Order of the Golden Fleece. Apparently he wrote to Empress Zita after the war asking her not to expel him from the latter order because of his erratic behaviour as Foreign Minister.

In 1919, he published his memoirs of his days as an insider in the Austro-Hungarian political and diplomatic arenas during World War I, called In the World War, an interesting look at the inside machinations of an ancient empire being pulled apart by war. In the book he suggested that future generation would remember the First World War as a prelude to world revolution.

Count von Czernin died in Vienna on 4 April 1932.

== In popular culture ==
Count von Czernin was portrayed by the actor Christopher Lee in an episode of the American television series The Young Indiana Jones Chronicles. The episode was entitled "Austria, March 1917" and premiered on the ABC television network on 21 September 1992.

== Works ==
- Im Weltkriege, Vienna, Ullstein & co, 1919 (In the World War, London, Cassell, 1919).
- Mein afrikanisches Tagebuch, Zurich, Amalthea, 1928.

== Sources ==
- August Demblin, Czernin und die Sixtus-Affaire, München, Drei Masken Verlag, 1920.
- —, Minister gegen Kaiser : Aufzeichnungen eines österreichisch-ungarischen Diplomaten über Aussenminister Czernin und Kaiser Karl, Wien, Böhlau Verlag, 1997.
- Ingeborg Meckling, Die Aussenpolitik des Grafen Czernin, München, R. Oldenbourg, 1969.
- Ladislaus Singer, Ottokar Graf Czernin: Staatsmann einer Zeitenwende, Graz, Verlag Styria, 1965.

== See also ==
- Vienna Conference (August 1, 1917)
- Vienna Conference (October 22, 1917)
- Vienna Conference (March 16, 1917)

Diplomatic posts
Preceded by Karl Emil Prinz zu Fürstenberg	Minister to Romania; 1913–1916	Succeeded by None
Political offices
Preceded by Stephan Freiherr Burián von Rajecz	Imperial Foreign Minister of Austria-Hungary; 1916–1918	Succeeded by Stephan Freiherr Burián von Rajecz
