= Vienna Conference (March 1917) =

Conference carried out after the February Revolution

Vienna Conference (16 March 1917)
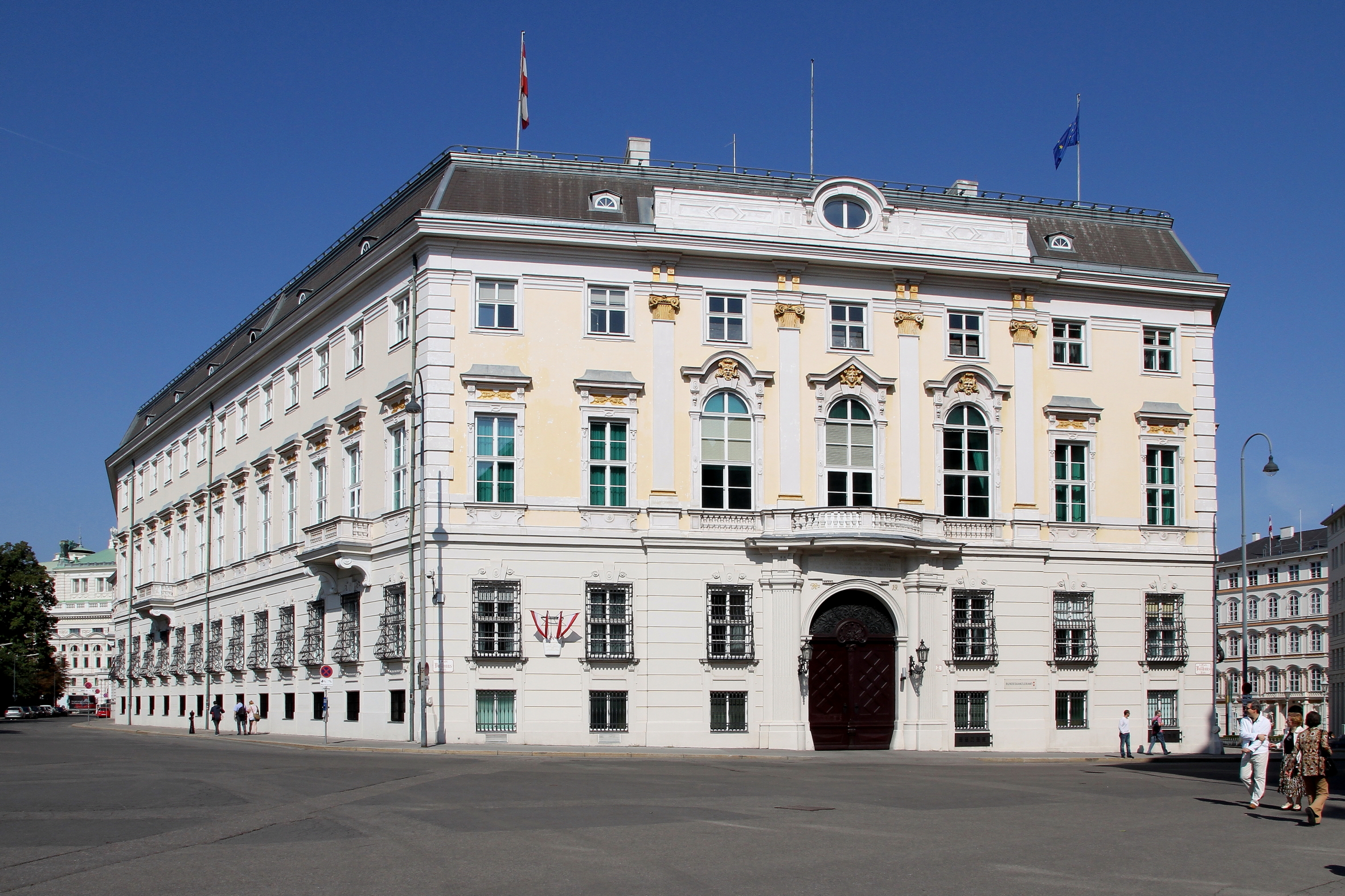
- Headquarters of the Foreign Ministry of the Dual Monarchy, on Vienna's Ballhausplatz (today the official residence of the Austrian Federal Chancellor).
- Date: 16 March 1917
- Location: Vienna
- Participants: Theobald von Bethmann Hollweg and Ottokar Czernin
- Outcome: Reaffirmation of the Reich's war aims

The Vienna Conference of 16 March 1917 was the first German-Austro-Hungarian meeting since the outbreak of the February Revolution in Russia. For Reich Chancellor Theobald von Bethmann Hollweg, the ministerial meeting was a further opportunity to reaffirm the Reich's war aims in the face of the dual monarchy's new Foreign Minister, Ottokar Czernin. Czernin, the minister of an empire in dire straits, tries to assert the point of view of the dual monarchy, exhausted by two and a half years of conflict, in the face of the Reich, the main driving force behind the quadruplice, and its demands for a compromise peace with the Allies. This decrepitude led Emperor Charles I and his advisors to multiply their initiatives to get out of the conflict, without breaking the alliance with the Reich.

== Context ==
=== Austro-Hungarian priority to withdraw from the conflict ===
The arrival of Charles I at the head of the dual monarchy did not, on the surface, alter the links with the Reich, nor the dual monarchy's desire to emerge from conflict; indeed, as soon as he took office, the emperor announced his desire to see peace restored between the dual monarchy and its adversaries.

The dual monarchy's domestic situation and the strained relations between Austria and Hungary prompted the new emperor-king to pursue a policy aimed at ending Austro-Hungarian participation in the conflict; indeed, Emperor Charles, panicked by the decrepitude of his empire weakened by the war, defended the idea of a compromise peace, based on the status quo, allowing the dual monarchy to withdraw.

To negotiate this compromise peace, emissaries were sent to Switzerland in early February 1917 to meet neutral and French diplomats, with a view to restoring relations with France, which were initially informal and discreet. However, the emissaries of the Dual Monarchy were actually maneuvered by Matthias Erzberger and Georg von Hertling, then Minister-President of the Kingdom of Bavaria.

=== The Central Powers and the Russian Revolution ===
The February Revolution put a temporary halt to operations on the Eastern Front, but forced the Reich and the Dual Monarchy to keep a large number of divisions in place to deal with the military initiatives of the provisional government.

However, the interpretation of events in Russia helped to widen the gap between the Reich and the Dual Monarchy. Indeed, Austro-Hungarian officials interpreted the Russian revolutionary events of February as a desire for peace; moreover, faced with a lacklustre domestic situation, the German and Austro-Hungarian populations could follow the example of a radical questioning of the political and economic order.

Finally, the revolution eliminated the Russian Army's operational capabilities, prompting the military planners of the Reich and the Dual Monarchy to redeploy part of their armies from the Eastern Front to Italy, the Balkans and the West.

=== The Reich close to victory ===
In the first half of 1917, the Reich and its allies seemed poised for victory over the Allies. The Russian front was paralyzed by the revolutionary process; Romania was conquered, and its agricultural and oil wealth rapidly exploited on behalf of the Reich and its allies; the all-out submarine war began to bear fruit: submarines threatened supplies to the United Kingdom; within the French army, a large-scale mutiny movement developed.

However, despite this positive balance sheet for the Reich at the end of the two-and-a-half-year war, it was becoming increasingly clear to the leaders of the Central Powers that they were no longer in a position to win the war. Nevertheless, Arthur Zimmermann, the Reich's State Secretary for Foreign Affairs at the time, was confident that the submarine war would asphyxiate the United Kingdom without leading to American intervention against the Central Powers.

== Negotiators ==
The conference was held at Ballhausplatz Palace, then the headquarters of the Austro-Hungarian Foreign Ministry and official residence of the joint Foreign Minister of the dual monarchy.

The Reich Chancellor, Theobald von Bethmann Hollweg, and the Austro-Hungarian Foreign Minister, Ottokar Czernin, took part in the discussions, in the presence of their principal collaborators.

== Discussions ==
=== The Reich's weight ===
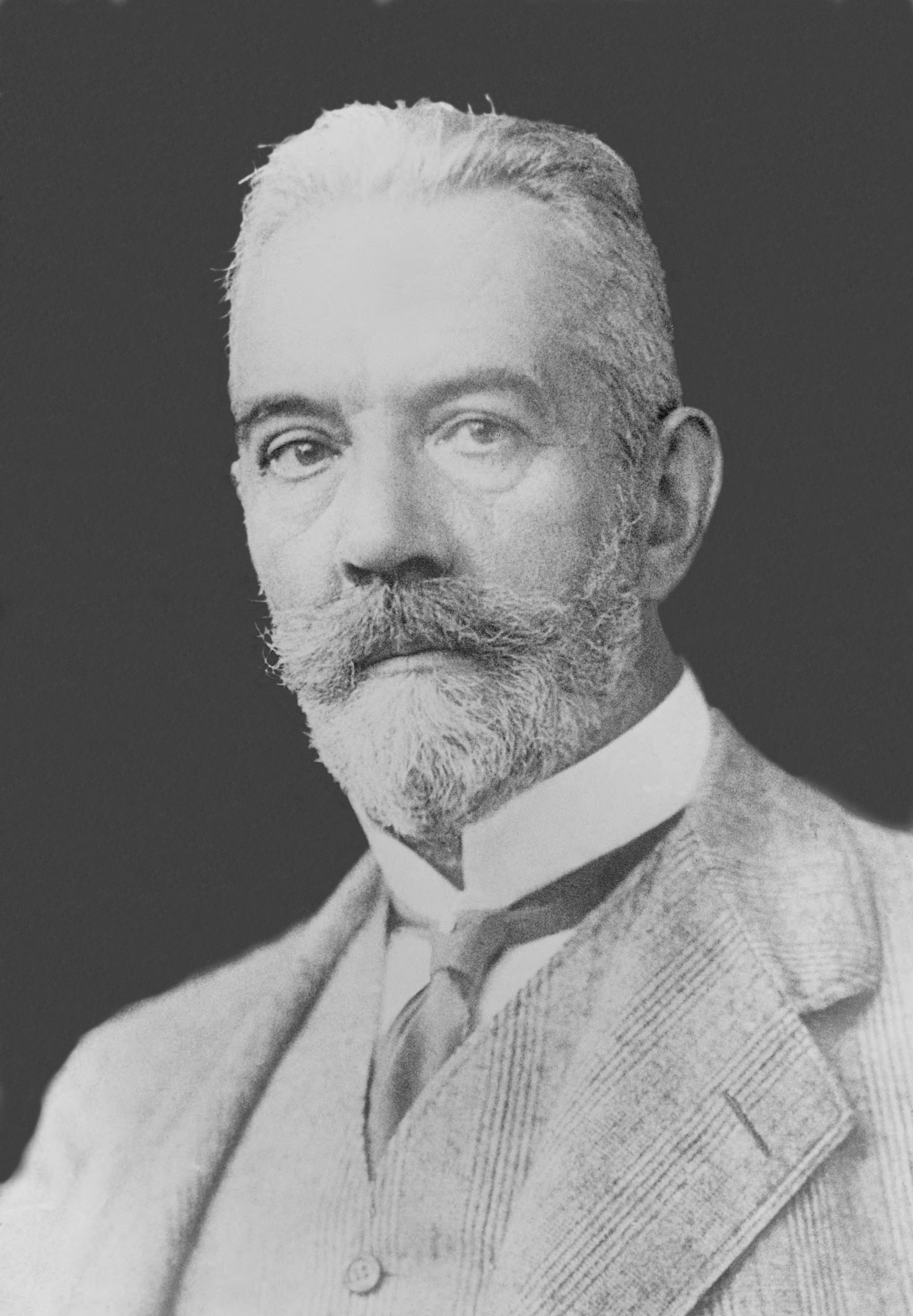
Reich Chancellor Theobald von Bethmann Hollweg, shown here in 1917, imposes his conception of war aims on his Austro-Hungarian interlocutor.

In the exchanges between the Reich Chancellor and the Austro-Hungarian Foreign Minister, Theobald von Bethamnn Hollweg imposed German goals on his Austro-Hungarian interlocutor, despite the formal equality between the members of the quadruplice.

At the beginning of 1917, the new Austro-Hungarian Foreign Minister tried once again to convince the Reich Chancellor to compromise on the conditions for ending the conflict.

Despite the existence of a balance of power with the Dual Monarchy that was largely in its favor, the importance of the Reich's positions must be put into perspective: Czernin in fact imposed a minimal framework for defining the war aims pursued by the two allies; the choice of this minimal program was, however, amended by the vagueness of the war aims developed.

The weakness of the actual concessions obtained by the Foreign Minister of the Dual Monarchy also illustrates the Reich's position as the main power interested in taking over Austro-Hungarian political and economic interests and positions in the Balkans and Eastern Europe.

=== Maintaining the Reich's war aims ===
While the political situation in Russia seemed to limit the Russian army's military initiatives, the Reich Chancellor posed as the victor on the Eastern Front. However, there was less and less certainty that the Reich and its allies would be victorious in the protracted conflict.

For this reason, the German representative opposed any "white peace" or compromise with the Allies. On 11 March, a few days before the conference with Czernin, Bethmann Hollweg defined the Reich's main war aims in front of one of his close advisors in the Reich Chancellery, Kurt Riezler, confirming his policy of giving Germany the means to become a true world power: the Chancellor proposed to lay the foundations for a rapprochement between the Reich and, initially, its immediate neighbors Belgium, Poland and the dual monarchy.

=== Conditions for ending the conflict ===
Against a backdrop of weakening military pressure on the Eastern Front, the German Bethmann-Hollweg and the Austro-Hungarian Czernin defined the minimum conditions under which the German Empire and the Dual Monarchy were prepared to emerge from the conflict.

For Germany, the end of the conflict must result, at worst, in a return to the status quo ante bellum, including the restitution of the German colonial empired. However, aware of the reality of the balance of power, Bethmann-Hollweg agreed to try to persuade the dioscuri, who were ultimately the real holders of political power in the Reich at that time, to agree to a compromise peace with the Allies. The German generals Paul von Hindenburg and Erich Ludendorff (the dioscuri) were thinking of forcing Wilhelm II, increasingly confined to a decorative role, to resign as Chancellor.

For Austro-Hungary, the territorial integrity of the dual monarchy was, at the end of the winter of 1916-1917, the main goal of the war. For Czernin, the return of the Austrian provinces was an absolute priority, even at the cost of abandoning Austro-Hungarian claims in Poland.

=== Shared conquests ===
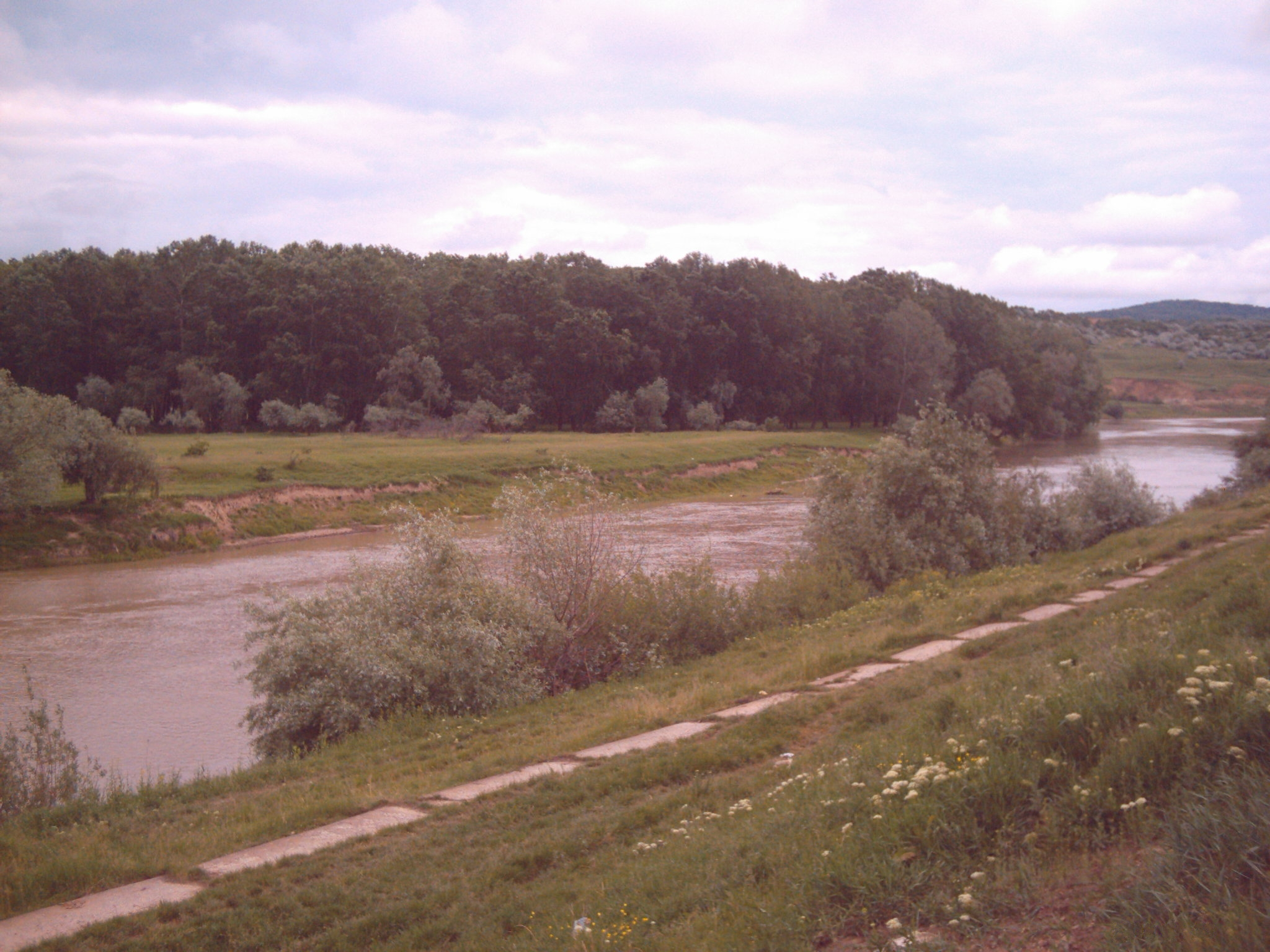
The Siret, here in the Roman region, is intended to mark the boundary between territories annexed to the dual monarchy and those promised to Russia.

The distribution of the territories conquered by the Reich and its allies since the outbreak of hostilities was also an issue in relations between the Reich and the Dual Monarchy at the beginning of 1917.

Their agreement emphasized the need for a balance between the "respective military results obtained by the two powers" and the devolution of the conquests to one or other of the empires.

However, in the course of exchanges between the two parties, the tenacious Austro-Hungarian imposed on the German, in exchange for the cession of Poland to the Reich, the transfer of Romania into the Austro-Hungarian sphere of influence: the dual monarchy would annex Romania west of the Siret, Bulgaria would recover Dobroudja, ceded in 1913, and Russia would annex the rest of the kingdom.

== Consequences ==
=== Minutes of 27 March ===
A single set of minutes was drawn up for the Vienna and Berlin conferences on 26 and 27 March; indeed, no minutes had been drawn up on the 16th.

The Reich Chancellor took part in the drafting of this protocol, but seems not to have informed either the Dioscuri, Paul von Hindenburg and Erich Ludendorff, or the Reich Secretary of State for Foreign Affairs, Arthur Zimmermann; nor did Theobald von Bethmann Hollweg inform his successor Georg Michaelis of the document's existence.

This text set a very flexible framework for the conditions of the end of the conflict, and divided the European conquests of the Quadruplice between the Reich, the Dual Monarchy and Bulgaria, according to the participation of each member of the alliance organized around the Reich in the common war effort.

=== The dual monarchy in the face of the Reich ===
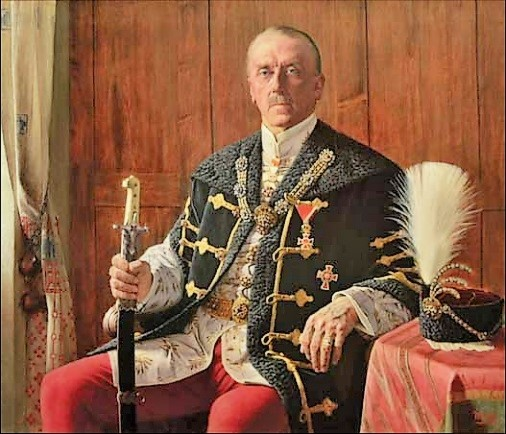
Ottokar Czernin in ambassador's uniform (portrait by painter Friedrich Miess).

As early as 22 March 1917, an Austro-Hungarian Council of Ministers was convened under the chairmanship of Emperor Charles I.

On this occasion, the Austro-Hungarian leaders developed an erroneous vision of the German policy of war aims; in fact, Charles and his ministers considered that the Germans were ready to question their plans in the West and to rectify the frontier in Alsace-Lorraine; in exchange for the Reich's renunciation of its claims in Belgium and France, Charles and his advisors proposed abandoning the claims of the dual monarchy in Poland, thus rallying to the "candidacy solution".

=== The Berlin Conference ===
As the Vienna conference was not followed by an agreement on the sharing of European conquests between the Reich and the Dual Monarchy, a new conference was convened in Berlin ten days later, on 26 and 27 March 1917.

This conference gave Ottokar Czernin the opportunity to go back on the arrangements made in Vienna, and to make the Reich's free hand in Poland conditional on the dual monarchy being granted freedom of action in Romania; moreover, the Austro-Hungarian minister made the opening of Austro-German negotiations for the conclusion of a customs union between the two empires conditional on Romania being allocated to the dual monarchy, an opening ardently desired by the Reich government.

== Bibliography ==
- Bled, Jean-Paul (2014). L'agonie d'une monarchie : Autriche-Hongrie 1914-1920. Paris: Taillandier. ISBN 979-10-210-0440-5.
- Fischer, Fritz (1970). Griff nach der Weltmacht [Les Buts de guerre de l’Allemagne impériale (1914-1918)] (in French). Translated by Migeon, Geneviève; Thiès, Henri. Paris: Éditions de Trévise.
- Lacroix-Riz, Annie (1996). Le Vatican, l'Europe et le Reich : De la Première Guerre mondiale à la guerre froide. Paris: Armand Colin. ISBN 2-200-21641-6.
- Soutou, Georges-Henri (1989). L'or et le sang : Les Buts de guerre économiques de la Première Guerre mondiale. Paris: Fayard. ISBN 2213022151.
- Renouvin, Pierre (1934). La Crise européenne et la Première Guerre mondiale. Paris: Presses universitaires de France.
- Kennedy, Paul Michael (1989). Naissance et déclin des grandes puissances : transformations économiques et conflits militaires entre 1500 et 2000 [The Rise and Fall of the Great Powers]. Translated by Cochez, Marie-Aude; Lebrave, Jean-Louis. Paris: Payot. ISBN 978-2-228-88401-3.

== See also ==
- Ottokar Czernin
- Georg Michaelis
- Germany's Aims in the First World War
- History of Austria-Hungary during World War I
