= Vienna Conference (August 1, 1917) =

Strategy meeting during World War I

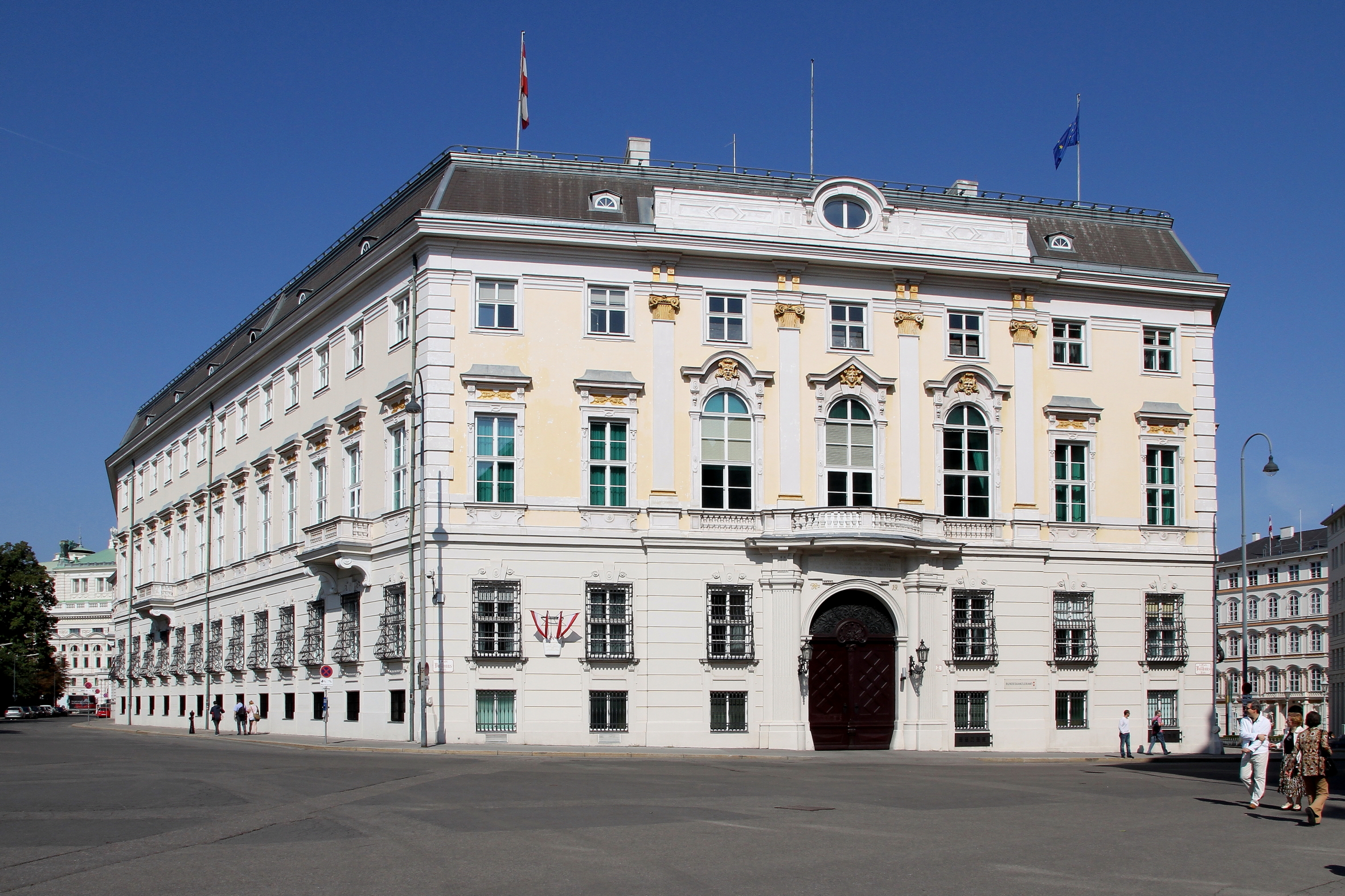
- Headquarters of the Foreign Ministry of the Dual Monarchy, on Vienna's Ballhausplatz (today the official residence of the Austrian Federal Chancellor).
- Date: August 1, 1917
- Location: Vienna
- Participants: Richard von Kühlmann and Ottokar Czernin
- Outcome: Reaffirmation of the Reich's war aims

The Vienna Conference of August 1, 1917 was a German-Austro-Hungarian governmental conference designed to regulate the sharing of the quadruple European conquests, (Note: The quadruple alliance groups together the alliances set up by the Reich between October 5, 1915 and September 29, 1918, the chronological reference point for Bulgarian intervention in the conflict.) against a backdrop of growing rivalry and divergence between the Imperial Reich (Note: From 1871 to 1945, the official name of the German state was Deutsches Reich. For the sake of convenience, it will thereafter be referred to simply as the Reich.) and the Dual Monarchy. Convened at a time when the dual monarchy was sinking into a crisis from which it proved unable to emerge until the autumn of 1918, the Vienna meeting was a further opportunity for German envoys to reaffirm the Reich's weight in the direction of the German-Austrian-Hungarian alliance, on the one hand, and in Europe, on the other.

== Context ==
=== The July Crisis of 1917 ===
In July 1917, a major institutional change took place in the Imperial Reich. The fall of Theobald von Bethmann-Hollweg on July 13 created the conditions for the transformation of the chancellors who succeeded him into front men for the Oberste Heeresleitung (OHL, German High Command); the question of war aims became a spur for the Dioscuri Paul von Hindenburg and Erich Ludendorff: (Note: These two soldiers appear inseparable, like the Dioscuri of Roman mythology.) Chancellor Bethmann-Hollweg accepted the conclusions of the April 23rd conference, defining the Reich's war aims as a "chimera", which was the main reason for his downfall.

However, the Chancellor saw opposition to his policy grow stronger with each passing week since the conferences of April and May 1917; an alliance of circumstance brought together parliamentarians, Kronprinz Wilhelm of Prussia and the Dioscuri. This alliance destabilized and then overwhelmed the Chancellor, who was finally disavowed by the Emperor.

At the end of this political crisis, Georg Michaelis, then supply commissioner in the Prussian cabinet, totally unacknowledged by the population, but approached by Theobald von Bethmann-Hollweg on the suggestion of Georg von Hertling, was appointed chancellor, after consultation by the emperor with Erich Ludendorff and Paul von Hindenburg, who appreciated his outspokenness; his first statements to parliament quickly made him the two generals' right-hand man.

=== Desire to emerge from conflict ===
The prolongation of the conflict exhausted Austria-Hungary. The gravity of the domestic situation created a feeling of "panic" among the Austro-Hungarian leaders, who were prepared to make numerous concessions in order to bring the dual monarchy out of the conflict. On April 13, 1917, Ottokar Czernin, the joint foreign minister, sent the new Emperor Charles an assessment of the Danube monarchy's economic and military exhaustion in his report entitled "Austrian military power in the process of disintegration".

At the same time, Charles I attempted to conduct parallel diplomacy, supported by Empress Zita's family, notably her brothers and cousins; however, these initiatives failed due to the emperor's hesitant and indecisive policy, which "remains in the middle of the ford", in the words of a letter from Ottokar Czernin to István Tisza, former Prime Minister of Hungary.

Faced with this worrying situation, the Germans multiplied their initiatives to impose the continuation of the conflict on their main ally: they sent unofficial missions, led in particular by Matthias Erzberger, and financed Austrian and Hungarian political parties in favor of maintaining the alliance between the Reich and the dual monarchy. Furthermore, during an audience with the Austro-Hungarian ambassador in Berlin, Gottfried de Hohenlohe-Schillingsfürst, on July 13, 1917, the German emperor spoke openly of German plans to invade the Dual Monarchy, should peace negotiations be opened with the Allies.

At the same time as these desperate steps were being taken, initiatives were being taken within the Reich to open peace negotiations. However, these initiatives, the fruit of the reflections of certain political and economic leaders, were quickly countered by the maximalist ambitions of the OHL military, hostile to the negotiation of a "peace of understanding" advocated by the majority of the Reichstag since August 4, 1914. (Note: On August 4, 1914, the Kaiser pleaded before the Reichstag for a "peace of understanding".)

Finally, in the days leading up to the conference, papal diplomacy was busy trying to put an end to the conflict. On August 1, 1917, a note from Pope Benedict XV was officially published. Prepared for months by the Vatican in agreement with the Reich government, according to historian Annie Lacroix-Riz, it responded both to the Austro-Hungarian desire to put an end to the conflict and to the Reich's political and territorial aspirations. The exact text of the Papal Note was known in Vienna on August 17, 1917, according to Jean-Paul Bled; however, its main provisions were known to the members of the Quadruplice shortly before the meeting on August 1, 1917.

=== Kreuznach agreements ===
Since Ottokar Czernin's acceptance of the final note on the Kreuznach discussions on June 18, 1917, German officials have continued to empty the May 18 agreement of its content: Central and Eastern Europe is thus divided into zones of German and Austro-Hungarian influence; however, this division does little to mask the reality of the balance of power between the two allies, with the Germans attempting to take the place of the Austro-Hungarians.

At Kreuznach, Albania, Montenegro, most of Serbia and Wallachia were destined to join the Austro-Hungarian sphere of influence; however, this devolution masked the strong economic influence that the Reich reserved for itself in the regions promised to become the domain of the dual monarchy.

The German negotiators reserved Poland for the Reich, promising strict political, economic and military control despite its formal independence, and eventually placing it under the scepter of Archduke Charles-Etienne of Teschen, cousin of the Kaiser-King; they also added control of certain strategic railways in Romania and the Austro-Hungarian Balkans.

== Participants ==
=== German negotiators ===
The German delegation was led by the new Reich Chancellor, Georg Michaelis, a foreign policy novice.

He was accompanied by the State Secretary for Foreign Affairs, the experienced Arthur Zimmermann. (Note: Arthur Zimmermann, a career diplomat, was the real head of the German delegation. However, he was forced to resign on August 6, 1917.) The latter was assisted by Under-Secretary of State Wilhelm von Stumm, in charge of his ministry's economic department.

=== Austro-Hungarian negotiators ===
Facing the Imperial Chancellor and his Secretary of State, the Austro-Hungarian Foreign Minister, Ottokar Czernin, assisted by his closest advisers, welcomed the new head of the German government.

Czernin was assisted by his chef de cabinet, Alexander Hoyos, (Note: Alexander Hoyos was sent to Berlin on July 5, 1914 to sound out the Reich government on how to deal with Serbia in the wake of the Assassination of Archduke Franz Ferdinand.) as well as Ladislas Müller von Szentgyörgyi and Ludwig von Flotow, two of his ministry's four section heads. (Note: The Austro-Hungarian Foreign Ministry was organized into sections.)

== Bilateral discussions ==
The Vienna discussions addressed three key issues in relations between the Reich and the dual monarchy, in a context marked by a certain frankness between participants and the advanced decrepitude of the Habsburg Empire at this stage of the conflict.

=== Pessimism among politicians ===
This German-Austrian-Hungarian conference, the first to be attended by the inexperienced Georg Michaelis, provided an opportunity for an unvarnished analysis of the situation of the Central Powers, strangled by the Allied blockade, food restrictions, raw material quotas and a slowly deteriorating military situation.

Indeed, the Chancellor took up the analyses of his predecessor, Theobald von Bethmann Hollweg, on the slow exhaustion of the Reich and its allies, but refused to admit that the prolongation of the conflict could only accentuate the defeat of the Reich and the Allied bloc organized around Germany.

=== Topics addressed ===
The conference on August 1 provided an opportunity for the German Secretary of State and his Austro-Hungarian counterpart to address the three main points of disagreement between the Reich and the Dual Monarchy at this stage of the conflict: the question of a separate peace with France, the Polish question and the division of the Balkans into a German and an Austro-Hungarian sphere of influence.

France was the vital linchpin of the Allied coalition. Its role prompted the Austro-Germans to try to get it out of the conflict as quickly as possible. The Vienna meeting was the first opportunity to discuss the implementation of a compromise with France, in the form of transfers of territory in German Alsace and Lorraine. German officials, informed of Austro-Hungarian initiatives towards France, were vehemently opposed to any exchange of territory that would result in the loss of Alsace-Lorraine to France.

The devolution of Poland, ogled by both the Reich and the Dual Monarchy, was the second subject of the August 1 conference. Indeed, since the 1915 offensives and the conquest of Russian Poland by the Central Powers, the question of its partition had proved a bone of contention between the two allies, with the Dioscuri opposing the "candidacy solution", (Note: During the conflict, German political leaders imagined devolving the Polish crown to a Habsburg archduke, king of a Poland totally controlled by the Reich.) while the Austro-Hungarian leaders wished to maintain the Dual Monarchy's commercial, economic and political influence in the restored kingdom.

Finally, the division of the Balkans into German and Austro-Hungarian zones of influence was the third and final point of contention between the leaders of the two empires. The Austro-Hungarian government was not indifferent to German policy in the Balkans: in Romania, the German occupiers requisitioned the pipelines through which Romanian oil was transported; to make these requisitions permanent and legal, the Reich government encouraged the creation of companies in which the Germans controlled the majority of the capital. Similarly, the occupation authorities attempted to impose a new body of law, aligned with that of the Reich. (Note: Until then, Romanian law had been heavily influenced by French law.) This systematic policy of taking control of the economy of a country then devolved to the Austro-Hungarian zone of influence created the conditions for friction between the two empires, as the Austro-Hungarians were reluctant to relinquish their zone of influence to the Reich. In Serbia, the presence of a German division enabled German companies not only to interfere in the management of the country's raw materials, shared between the Austro-Hungarians and the Bulgarians, but also to directly control the railroads in the occupied kingdom.

=== Austro-Hungarian proposals ===
Faced with an increasingly uncertain domestic situation, Austro-Hungarian leaders took a series of initiatives in an attempt to open peace negotiations with the Allies.

On behalf of his emperor, Ottokar Czernin proposed not only the cession of Galicia to the new Polish state, but also the abandonment of Austro-Hungarian positions in Poland in favor of the Reich. In exchange, the Reich would negotiate hypothetical concessions in Alsace-Lorraine with the French.

The Austro-Hungarian minister also proposed the resumption of economic negotiations with the Reich with a view to concluding a trade agreement between the two empires, with exchanges on the nature of economic and commercial ties; thus, to counter German proposals for a customs union between the Reich and the dual monarchy, Czernin proposed the conclusion of an economic agreement including the implementation of the most-favored-nation clause.

Finally, he proposed opening negotiations with France and the United Kingdom on the basis of a return to the status quo of 1914: aware of Belgium's importance to the conclusion of peace, Ottokar Czernin advocated evacuating the kingdom and re-establishing its independence, just as he proposed a return to the French border line of July 1914, provoking a violent reaction from Kaiser Wilhelm and his advisors.

== Issue ==
After the discussions between Czernin on the one hand, and Michaelis, Zimmermann and von Stumm on the other, minutes of the meeting were drawn up by the German and Austro-Hungarian secretaries. The minutes reflect the growing mistrust between the respective representatives of the two empires. Moreover, the Austro-Hungarians, aware of the impossibility of concluding a general peace, were content to propose partial agreements designed to secure the exit of France, the linchpin of the Allied coalition, from the conflict, which was now entering its fourth year.

=== Mutual mistrust ===
Since Charles I's ascension to the throne, the leaders of the dual monarchy have changed their attitude towards their German counterparts. They were less enthusiastic about the Reich and its policies.

The spring and summer of 1917 were marked by the beginnings of this change in attitude: the multiplication of contacts in an attempt to iron out differences, often without success, the dispatch to the Germans of the report on the situation of the common army, and the attempts at parallel diplomacy launched on the initiative of Emperor Charles, were all symptoms of the Austro-Hungarian desire to alleviate the tutelage of the Reich.

At this conference, this as yet unformalized mistrust became palpable, as the arrival on the throne of a new monarch marked a break in relations between the Reich and the dual monarchy. Indeed, the young emperor changed the policy of the dual monarchy, no longer aligning his policy as systematically as his predecessor with the Reich.

=== Persistence of German war aims ===
Discussions on August 1, 1917 confirmed the Reich's objectives, with German negotiators categorically rejecting Austro-Hungarian peacemaking proposals.

In this context, the conference provided a further opportunity for German leaders to define and pursue their Eastern policy in the Baltic states, Poland and Ukraine. Taking up the objectives formulated in Bingen the day before, German representatives wished to encourage the emergence of separatist movements in Ukraine and the Baltic states: intended to form independent governments, the members of these movements, financed by the Reich, were promised to bind their states to Germany through long-term agreements, giving German war aims a veneer of local support.

Austro-Hungarian proposals, which openly opposed German war aims, were dismissed out of hand, in particular the transfer of Austrian Galicia to Poland, as these conflicted with the German objectives of placing Ukraine under trusteeship, as stated in September 1914 by Theobald von Bethmann Hollweg, then Chancellor.

Finally, according to Wilhelm von Stumm, then Under-Secretary of State for Foreign Affairs, Poland, Romania and Ukraine were to become part of a vast economic entity under Reich control. These objectives were simply mentioned to Czernin and those close to him, who were not fooled by German intentions, but had no means of opposing them other than by negotiating the share of influence that the double monarchy could retain in this vast ensemble, aggregated with the Mitteleuropa thus enlarged to the East.

=== German-Austro-Hungarian alliance strengthened ===
The mutual distrust that had characterized relations between the Reich and the Dual Monarchy since Charles's accession to the Austro-Hungarian throne did not call into question the growing rapprochement between the two empires.

True to his policy of aligning himself with Reich policy, Ottokar Czernin tried to assert the dual monarchy's point of view in bilateral discussions, while displaying perfect concordance with German positions in his public pronouncements. In practice, however, this meant giving in to the Reich whenever his German interlocutors were determined to defend the Reich's views.

On August 1, Czernin guaranteed the solidity of the German-Austrian-Hungarian alliance, describing any attempt to negotiate with the Allies as "felony"; he also reminded his interlocutors, who were fully aware of Austria-Hungary's internal decay, of the situation of the dual monarchy, whose citizens had been suffering restrictions since the autumn of 1914, in a further attempt to influence German policy with a view to opening peace negotiations with the Allies.

Finally, the planning of a breakthrough offensive on the Italian front, impossible without substantial German support, prompted the leaders of the common army to accept a strengthening of the German-Austro-Hungarian alliance in the hope of succeeding in detaching Italy from the Allied camp. Indeed, German intrusion into the management of the Alpine front increased the dual monarchy's dependence on the Reich, making the latter ever more indispensable to the continuation of the Austro-Hungarian war effort.

== Bibliography ==
- Bled, Jean-Paul (2014). L'agonie d'une monarchie : Autriche-Hongrie 1914-1920. Paris: Taillandier. ISBN 979-10-210-0440-5.
- Fischer, Fritz (1970). Griff nach der Weltmacht [Les Buts de guerre de l’Allemagne impériale (1914-1918)] (in German). Translated by Migeon, Geneviève; Thiès, Henri. Paris: Éditions de Trévise.
- Lacroix-Riz, Annie (1996). Le Vatican, l'Europe et le Reich : De la Première Guerre mondiale à la guerre froide. Paris: Armand Colin. ISBN 2-200-21641-6.
- Mommsen, Wolgang J. (1968). "L'opinion allemande et la chute du gouvernement Bethmann-Hollweg". Revue d'histoire moderne et contemporaine. 15 (1): 39–53. doi:10.3406/rhmc.1968.3328.
- Renouvin, Pierre (1934). La Crise européenne et la Première Guerre mondiale. Paris: Presses universitaires de France.
- Soutou, Georges-Henri (1989). L'or et le sang : Les Buts de guerre économiques de la Première Guerre mondiale. Paris: Fayard. ISBN 2213022151.

== See also ==
- Ottokar Czernin
- Georg Michaelis
- Germany's Aims in the First World War
- History of Austria-Hungary during World War I
