= Berlin Conference (disambiguation) =

The Berlin Conference may refer to:

- Congress of Berlin (1878), concerning the aftermath of the Russo-Turkish War and the political future of the Balkans
- Berlin Conference (1884–85), concerning the Scramble for Africa
- Berlin Conference (1897), an international congress regarding the growing number of leprosy cases
- Berlin Conference (March 26-27, 1917), meeting intended to define the war aims of Germany and Austria-Hungary
- Berlin Conference (March 31, 1917), reassessing German policy on Eastern Europe after Russia’s February Revolution
- Berlin Conference (November 2-6, 1917), intended to fine-tune the outcome of the Austro-German negotiations at Kreuznach held the previous spring.
- Berlin Conference (1945), an older alternative name for the Potsdam Conference
- Berlin Conference (1954), concerning the Cold War
- 1976 Conference of Communist and Workers Parties of Europe, meeting of European communist parties
- Iran After the Elections conference (2000), also known as Berlin Conference
- Berlin Conference (2020), concerning the Second Libyan Civil War
