= Kreuznach Conference (October 7, 1917) =

Meeting of the German government and military in Bad Kreuznach

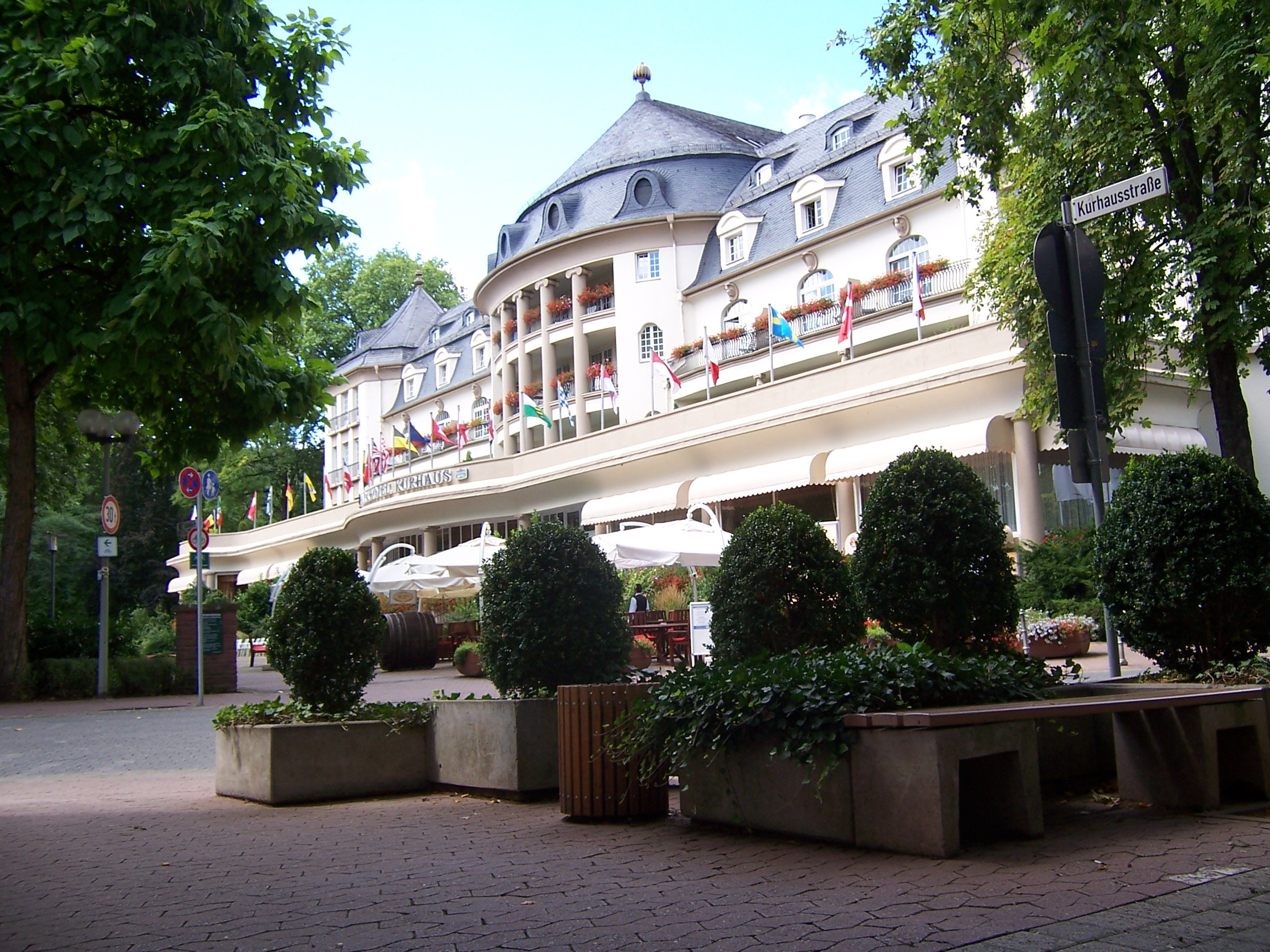
- The Parkhotel Kurhaus, a luxury hotel in Bad Kreuznach, headquarters of the German Army's Supreme Command, from January 2, 1917 to March 8, 1918.
- Date: October 7, 1917
- Location: Bad Kreuznach
- Type: Strategy meeting
- Participants: Wilhelm II, Georg Michaelis, Richard von Kühlmann, Paul von Hindenburg, Erich Ludendorff
- Outcome: Setting a new war aims program.

The Kreuznach Conference, held on October 7, 1917, was a meeting of the German government and military chaired by Kaiser Wilhelm II. It took place in Bad Kreuznach, the headquarters of the Oberste Heeresleitung, the supreme command of the Imperial German Army. (Note: This spa town was selected as the headquarters of the Oberste Heeresleitung due to its numerous hotel accommodations.) The meeting was convened to define new war aims for the Imperial Reich (Note: From 1871 to 1945, the official name of the German national state was Deutsches Reich, which was subsequently referred to as Reich.) as the First World War entered its fourth year. During the conference, the German government prepared for negotiations with Austria-Hungary in Vienna on October 22, 1917. This involved drawing up a list of demands that the German negotiators intended to present to the dual monarchy, which was experiencing the effects of the conflict.

== Background ==
=== The Reich against Russia ===
Richard von Kühlmann, then State Secretary for Foreign Affairs, engaged in comprehensive discourse on the political situation in Russia during the pre-conference exchanges. The Secretary of State reiterated the assessments of his predecessors, Gottlieb von Jagow and Arthur Zimmermann, regarding Russia as a significant threat, even after imposing a favorable peace treaty and large-scale territorial concessions, reflecting a German victory over the new Russian government born of the February Revolution. The Russian army had been severely weakened by mass desertions since March 1917, leaving it incapable of mounting a military challenge.

=== German-Austro-Hungarian tensions ===
The late summer and autumn of 1917 marked a new phase in relations between the Reich and the Dual Monarchy. For several months, the Austro-Hungarians had been intensifying their efforts to establish the conditions for a peace compromise between the two alliance blocs. As early as August, the Austro-Hungarian Foreign Minister, Ottokar Czernin, informed his German counterpart, Richard von Kühlmann, of the opening of indirect talks between the Dual Monarchy and France. This prompted the Germans to step up initiatives forging closer ties between the Reich and the Habsburg Empire.

Additionally, a few days prior to this meeting, Ottokar Czernin publicly expressed his desire for a peace agreement that would exclude any territorial annexations or financial compensation. This statement was made during a gala dinner in Budapest hosted by Hungarian Minister-President Sándor Wekerle. Czernin's position was met with strong opposition from the German side. (Note: However, Czernin's versatility made it challenging for him to gain the trust of Reich representatives.)

=== The peace note of August 1, 1917 ===
Due to the prolonged nature of the war, the parties involved were experiencing fatigue after nearly three years of conflict. Against this backdrop, in early August 1917, Pope Benedict XV published an appeal for a return to peace in Europe based on the status quo ante bellum.

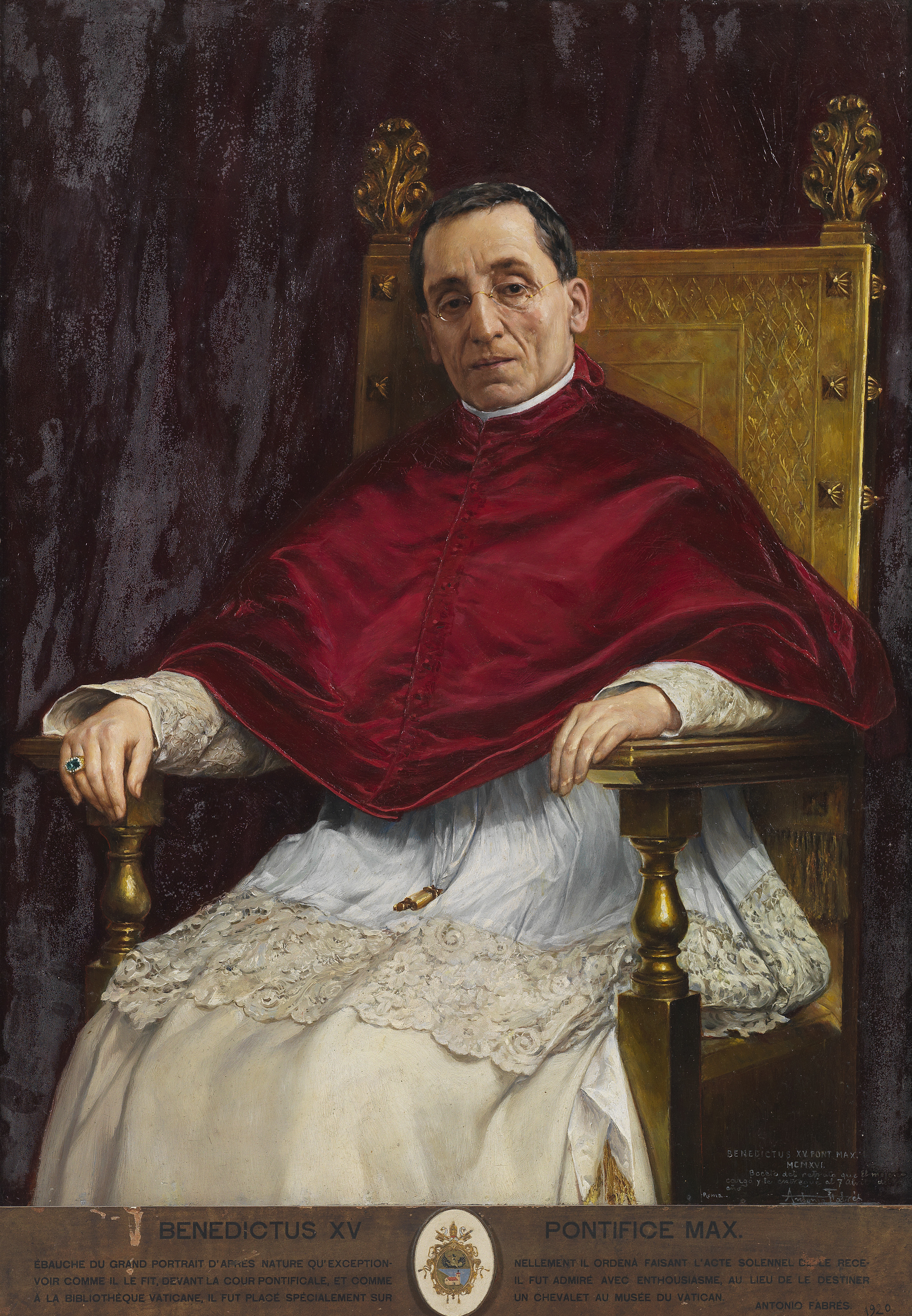
On August 1, 1917, Pope Benedict XV published an appeal for world peace.

In light of these developments, Pope Benedict XV issued an appeal for general peace in Europe. The note, drafted by Eugenio Pacelli, the newly appointed Apostolic Nuncio in Bavaria, (Note: The Kingdom of Bavaria, within the German Empire, was afforded a certain degree of autonomy, which enabled it to establish a diplomatic network and pursue other strategic objectives.) urged the parties to the conflict to commence negotiations to restore peace and prevent the dissolution of the dual Austro-Hungarian monarchy.

This appeal, which stirred reservations among Catholics, prompted Reich officials to devise a new, impactful program of war aims. On August 24, the Quadruplice responded to the papal note with a brief, general reply that did not divulge detailed information about their war aims.

However, as early as September 11, 1917, at a meeting of the German Crown Council convened at Bellevue Palace (Note: The German Crown Council, chaired by the Emperor, convenes the Imperial Chancellor, his State Secretaries, and German and Prussian political and military leaders to define Reich policy.) in Berlin, the Reich's political leaders provided a detailed account of their objectives in Belgium, a point of contention with the Allies. At the urging of Chancellor Georg Michaelis and State Secretary Richard von Kühlmann, the Kaiser agreed to relinquish the Belgian coastline but reconsidered after consulting with the Dioscuri.

Concurrently, nationalists and pangermanists initiated a series of measures aimed at challenging the influence of Catholics on German political life as part of the Kulturkampf. In a context marked by the anniversary of Luther's publication of the Wittenberg Theses, the starting point of the Protestant Reformation, the conservatives of the National Party (Note: The National Party is a Prussian-based political organization that was established to support the policy of war aims.) leveraged the figure of the Saxon reformer. They positioned him as an exclusively German symbol.

== Participants ==
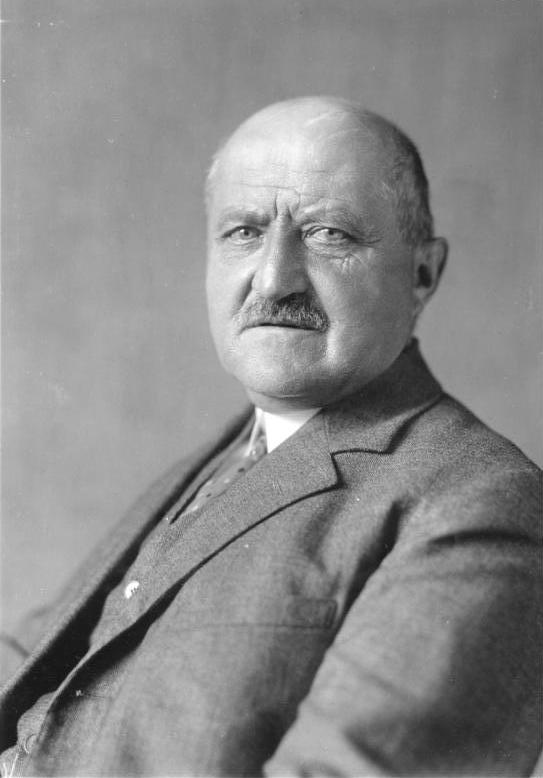
The October 7 conference was presided over by Reich Chancellor Georg Michaelis (photographed in 1932).

The Reich Chancellor, Georg Michaelis, played a significant role in the conference, presiding over it in the Kaiser's absence. Richard von Kühlmann, the State Secretary for Foreign Affairs, further bolstered his leadership. The two most senior German commanders, Paul von Hindenburg and Erich Ludendorff, (Note: Inseparable from each other in the eyes of German public opinion, war propaganda likened these two soldiers to the Dioscuri of mythology.) also attended the conference.

== Reaffirming German war aims. ==
During the meeting, the military outlined the goals of the war, which would conclude the three-year conflict. This was presented in a memorandum containing 24 points. The military and the civilians had different views on how to proceed, with the military in favor of the devolution of the Polish crown to a Habsburg archduke.

=== Military projects ===
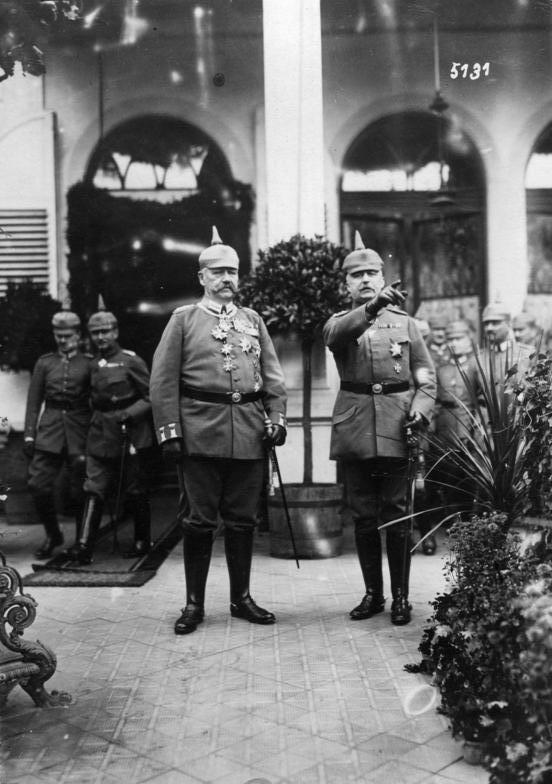
On October 2, 1917, in Kreuznach, Paul von Hindenburg and Erich Ludendorff opposed the idea of a customs union with the Dual Monarchy.

This document outlines the new strategic directions the military would like to see implemented in pursuit of their war aims. The Dioscuri sought to establish the conditions for the Reich's victory, to place the Dual Monarchy under the Reich's strict tutelage for twenty years within a defensive and offensive military alliance as part of the constitution of Mitteleuropa.

Furthermore, the Dioscuri sought to negotiate the Dual Monarchy's withdrawal from Romania in exchange for Poland. The German military sought to persuade Austria-Hungary to commit to maintaining its involvement in the conflict until the Reich had achieved victory.

In particular, Erich Ludendorff opposed any policy establishing a customs union with the Dual Monarchy. This was because, in their view, the Dual Monarchy was no longer a viable economic partner for the Reich, given its weakened state. These individuals opposed any policy guaranteeing the Reich free access to the global market. Instead, they favored implementing solutions that would ensure Germany's self-sufficiency in Central Europe, facilitate its reorganization for the benefit of the Reich, or, failing that, obtain long-term agreements with neighboring states.

=== Compromise ===
Following a detailed discussion between the civilian and military representatives, Chancellor Michaelis reached a compromise between the positions put forth by the Dioscuri and those proposed by Secretary of State Richard von Kühlmann. The primary points of contention related to the form that German pre-eminence in Europe should take rather than the validity or geographical scope of this pre-eminence. In this instance, they engaged in a dispute with civilians, staunch proponents of the devolution of Poland's crown to a Habsburg archduke. Despite this, they prevailed in their objective to annex a considerable portion of Poland's border. (Note: This coup de force was called into question by the results of the conference held on October 22.)

== Outcome ==
At the conclusion of the meeting, the German leaders in attendance reached a consensus and formalized a 24-point program. Historian Fritz Fischer divides this program into two groups: the demands that ensured the Reich's economic and political development after victory and the modalities for placing Austria-Hungary under trusteeship, which was experiencing the effects of the conflict. This program reflects the initial terms set forth by the military. All participants supported resuming economic negotiations with the Dual Monarchy to establish a customs union between the two empires, thereby creating a theoretically equal footing. (Note: At this stage of the conflict, the exhausted dual monarchy was more than ever at the Reich's discretion.)

=== Fulfilling German war aims ===
The 24 points defined by the participants emphasized the need to achieve the Reich's war aims to ensure the mission's success. With a strategic approach, the German leaders sought to negotiate a change in the relationship between the Reich and the Austro-Hungarian Empire. Their objective was clear: to secure the Austro-Hungarian delegation's commitment to maintaining the conflict until the Reich's war aims had been fully achieved. This would have effectively placed the Habsburg monarchy under German control.

The German command sought an agreement with the Austro-Hungarian delegation on this point to achieve ambitious aspirations. They sought to have Austro-Hungarian diplomacy endorse the recognition of a German trusteeship in Courland, Lithuania, the restitution of German colonies, and the establishment of a vast colonial unit under German trusteeship in Central Africa.

=== The Reich's additional security ===
The conference concluded with the drafting of a 24-point program, resulting from a compromise between civilian and military stakeholders and reflecting the Reich's most ambitious objectives. The program defined the territorial war aims and political objectives and established the conditions for the Reich to maintain its long-term economic, political, and military preeminence in Europe.

It is noteworthy that the German leaders, including the Dioscuri, Chancellor Georg Michaelis, State Secretary for Foreign Affairs Richard von Kühlmann, and Kaiser Wilhelm, all unanimously adopted free access to all European and global markets as their guiding principle. This decision, which demonstrated a lack of interest in the West, was a strategic move. Their primary objective was to secure a deep-water port, either in Cattaro, which was then part of Austrian Dalmatia, or in Valona, which was under Italian control. This would ensure the Reich's access to the Mediterranean Sea.

In exchange for this minimal interest in Western Europe's territories and markets, the German negotiators aimed to secure significant autonomy on its eastern margins. This included encouraging the development of new states in Ukraine, Poland, and the Baltic States. These new or restored states were to be formally independent but strongly linked to the Reich through political, military, and commercial agreements.

=== New relations with the dual monarchy ===
The transfer of Austrian Silesia to the Reich in red ensured territorial continuity between Germany and Hungary, as well as with Bulgaria and the Ottoman Empire.

By requiring the Dual Monarchy to remain engaged in the conflict, Erich Ludendorff aimed to accelerate its complete exhaustion, strengthening the position for negotiating its submission to the Reich. At the conference, Dioscurus stated that he wanted to eliminate any room for Austria-Hungary to maneuver or exercise autonomy by requiring his representatives to keep the Habsburg Empire engaged in the conflict until the conclusion of general peace. The goal was to force the Habsburg monarchy into a broad political and economic union, placing the dual monarchy in a position of strict dependence on the Reich.

Notably, the robust opposition from Austria-Hungary proved pivotal in the final stages of the process that commenced in 1878. A comprehensive agenda was devised to surmount this opposition, delineating the key issues to be addressed with the Austro-Hungarians, particularly regarding Poland.

In this program, formal concessions were made, with the crown of Poland reverting to a Habsburg archduke under conditions allowing the Reich to exert control over the kingdom's political, military, and economic affairs. However, despite German demands, Austro-Hungarian negotiators strongly opposed the devolution of Poland to the Dual Monarchy. This allowed Ludendorff to present the Austro-Polish question as a potential trigger for future conflict between the Reich and the Dual Monarchy.

German military leaders, notably the Dioscuri, were able to successfully influence Chancellor Michaelis to adopt their policies. This included the annexation of Austrian Silesia to Prussia, as well as the authorization of the construction of a direct link between the Reich's rail network and the Hungarian rail network, with connections extending to the Romanian, Bulgarian, and Ottoman rail networks.

The Dioscuri were pessimistic about the future of the Reich, even in the event of a German victory. They believed that Austria-Hungary would soon join the Reich's enemies after its victory in the current conflict. Paul von Hindenburg and, even more so, his second-in-command Erich Ludendorff, anticipated a future conflict once German victory was assured through the imposition of peace treaties on the Allies. This war would be waged not only against the vanquished, who would have rebuilt their military and economic capabilities, but also against the Habsburg monarchy, which had become hostile to the Reich. In counting the dual monarchy among the Reich's enemies, the Dioscuri were, in effect, repeating the analyses of Erich von Falkenhayn, their predecessor on the General Staff.

== See also ==
- Bad Kreuznach
- Wilhelm II
- Georg Michaelis
- Richard von Kühlmann
- Oberste Heeresleitung
- Dioscuri (World War I)
- Paul von Hindenburg
- Erich Ludendorff
- Germany's Aims in the First World War

== Bibliography ==
- Bogdan, Henry (2014). Le Kaiser Guillaume II : Dernier empereur d'Allemagne (in French). Paris: Tallandier. ISBN 9791021005174.
- Fischer, Fritz (1970). Les Buts de guerre de l'Allemagne impériale (1914-1918) (in French). Translated by Geneviève Migeon and Henri Thiès. Paris: Éditions de Trévise.
- Lacroix-Riz, Annie (1996). Le Vatican, l'Europe et le Reich : De la Première Guerre mondiale à la guerre froide (in French). Paris: Armand Colin. ISBN 978-2200216412.
- Laparra, Jean-Claude; Hesse, Pascal (2011). L'Envers des parades : Le commandement de l'armée allemande : réalités et destins croisés 1914-1918 (in French). Paris: Soteca. ISBN 978-2916385778.
- Renouvin, Pierre (1948). La Crise européenne et la Première Guerre mondiale (in French). Vol. 19. Paris: Presses universitaires de France. ISSN 0768-5246.
- Schiavon, Max (2011). L'Autriche-Hongrie dans la Première Guerre mondiale : La fin d'un empire (in French). Soteca. ISBN 9782916385594.
- Soutou, Georges-Henri (1989). L'Or et le sang : Les Buts de guerre économiques de la Première Guerre mondiale (in French). Paris: Fayard. ISBN 978-2213022154.
