= Berlin Conference (November 2–6, 1917) =

Strategy meeting during World War I

Berlin Conference (November 2-6, 1917)
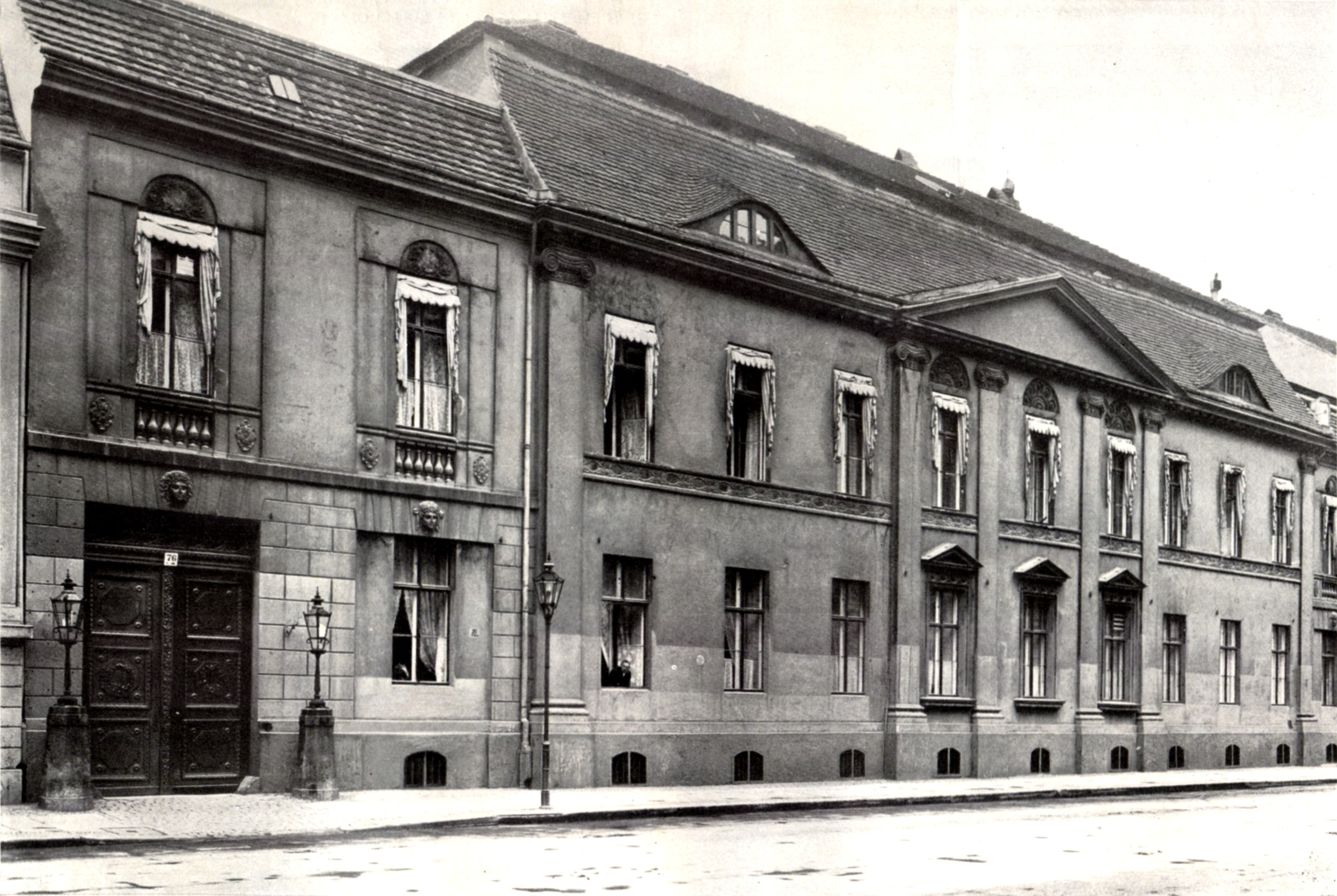
- The headquarters of the Reich Foreign Office
- Date: November 2–6, 1917
- Location: German Empire, Berlin
- Type: Strategic meeting
- Outcome: Upholding the provisions of the Kreuznach Conference of May 17-18, 1917

The Berlin Conference, held from November 2 to 6, 1917, consisted of a series of meetings between German and Prussian ministers, followed by meetings between German and Austro-Hungarian representatives. The conference was held in Berlin just a few days before the outbreak of the October Revolution. At the same time, the antagonisms between Chancellor Georg Michaelis, supported by State Secretary Richard von Kühlmann, on the one hand, and the military, mainly the Dioscuri, Paul von Hindenburg and Erich Ludendorff, on the other, reached a climax, prompting the military to call for the Chancellor's resignation, formalizing their disagreements over the program for internal reform of the Reich. (Note: From 1871 to 1945, the official name of the German state was Deutsches Reich.) (Note: In 1917, an ambitious program of political reform in Prussia and the Reich, led by Chancellors Theobald von Bethmann Hollweg and his successor Georg Michaelis, divided German leaders, with the military siding with the conservatives.) These differences between political and military leaders also had at stake the definition of a new program of war aims for the Reich, and the concessions the Germans would be prepared to make to their allies, principally the Dual Monarchy, exhausted by more than three years of conflict, but hostile to any excessive reinforcement of German control over Central and Eastern Europe.

== Context ==
=== Situation of the Central Powers in the fall of 1917 ===
In the fall of 1917, the military situation of the Central Powers was mixed: major successes had been achieved, but these were not enough to decide the outcome of the conflict, since the armies of the Quadruple Alliance were suffering increasing handicaps, leading to an increasingly pronounced weakening as the months went by.

Since the defeats it suffered in 1916 at Verdun and on the Somme, the German army has been facing a manpower crisis, with losses increasing slowly but surely as the months go by. However, this weakening, untenable over the long term, did not prevent partial successes: the armies of the Quadruple Alliance were still capable of halting Allied offensives, calling into question their preparation and depriving the Allies of any offensive capability in Italy. As the months went by, the Quadruple Alliance's losses became more and more difficult to make up, and they were no longer in a position to win. However, backed by the Reich, the Dual Monarchy was able to inflict an almost total defeat on the Italians on the Isonzo, while the tenacity of the German soldiers deprived the British, French and Belgians of a strategic victory in Flanders.

These partial successes enabled the Dual Monarchy to improve the military situation it had to face: the decomposition of the Russian army, amplified by the failure of the Kerensky offensive launched on July 1, in 1917, removing any danger of a Russian offensive return to Austro-Hungarian Galicia; in the Balkans, despite appreciable tactical successes, the Allies did not yet have offensive capabilities likely to threaten the cohesion of the Austro-Bulgarian front in 1917. This military recovery, impossible without the support of the Reich, did not, however, mask the seriousness of the Dual Monarchy's domestic situation, which had already given cause for concern when the report entitled "Austro-Hungarian Military Power on the Way to Disintegration" was submitted to Emperor Charles I on April 13, 1917. Finally, aware of this exhaustion, Austro-Hungarian officials multiplied their initiatives to end the conflict, with Austro-Hungarian Foreign Minister Ottokar Czernin proposing bilateral talks with Paul Painlevé, then President of the French Council.

Finally, Austro-Hungarian and German strategic planners prepared multiple offensives to be launched in France and Italy during the spring of 1918; moreover, since October 26, German-Austro-Hungarian units have been engaged in the pursuit of the retreating Italian army on the Isonzo front. (Note: On October 24, 1917, a German-Austro-Hungarian breakaway offensive broke the Italian front, which had been frozen along the Isonzo since Italy's entry into the war on May 23, 1915.)

=== The Austro-German agreements of Kreuznach ===
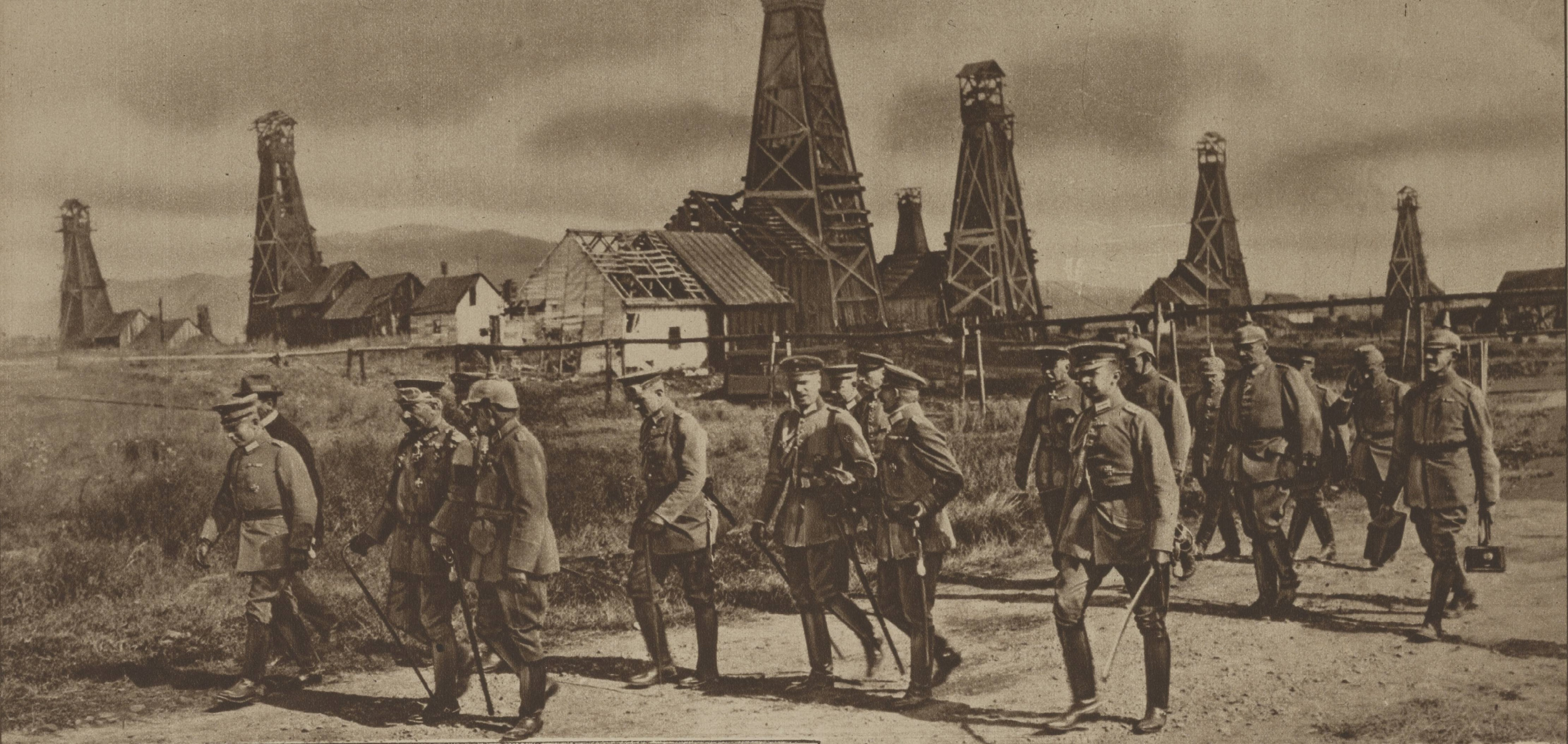
Wilhelm II visiting Romania's oil fields in 1917.

On May 17, 1917, at the first official meeting between Wilhelm II and Charles I, a solution had been found to divide the continent into a German and an Austro-Hungarian sphere of influence, allocating Poland, Courland and Lithuania to the Reich and Romania, then occupied by the armies of the Quadruple Alliance, to the Dual Monarchy.

On June 18, 1917, the Austro-Hungarians approved the terms of the final note on the Kreuznach negotiations of the previous May; the Council of Ministers of the Dual Monarchy (Note: The Dual Monarchy Council of Ministers brings together the joint ministers of finance and war, and the Austrian and Hungarian prime ministers, under the dual chairmanship of the emperor and the foreign minister.) accepted the Kreuznach program of war aims, defining the regions to be annexed to the Reich and the Dual Monarchy, as well as the zones under the control of independent states, but promised to strict German or Austro-Hungarian control.

However, German officials soon showed an interest in Romania, particularly after a visit to the occupied kingdom by Wilhelm II in September 1917, after which the German emperor was won over by Romania's "billions", essentially its mining and agricultural wealth.

=== The German program of October 7, 1917 ===
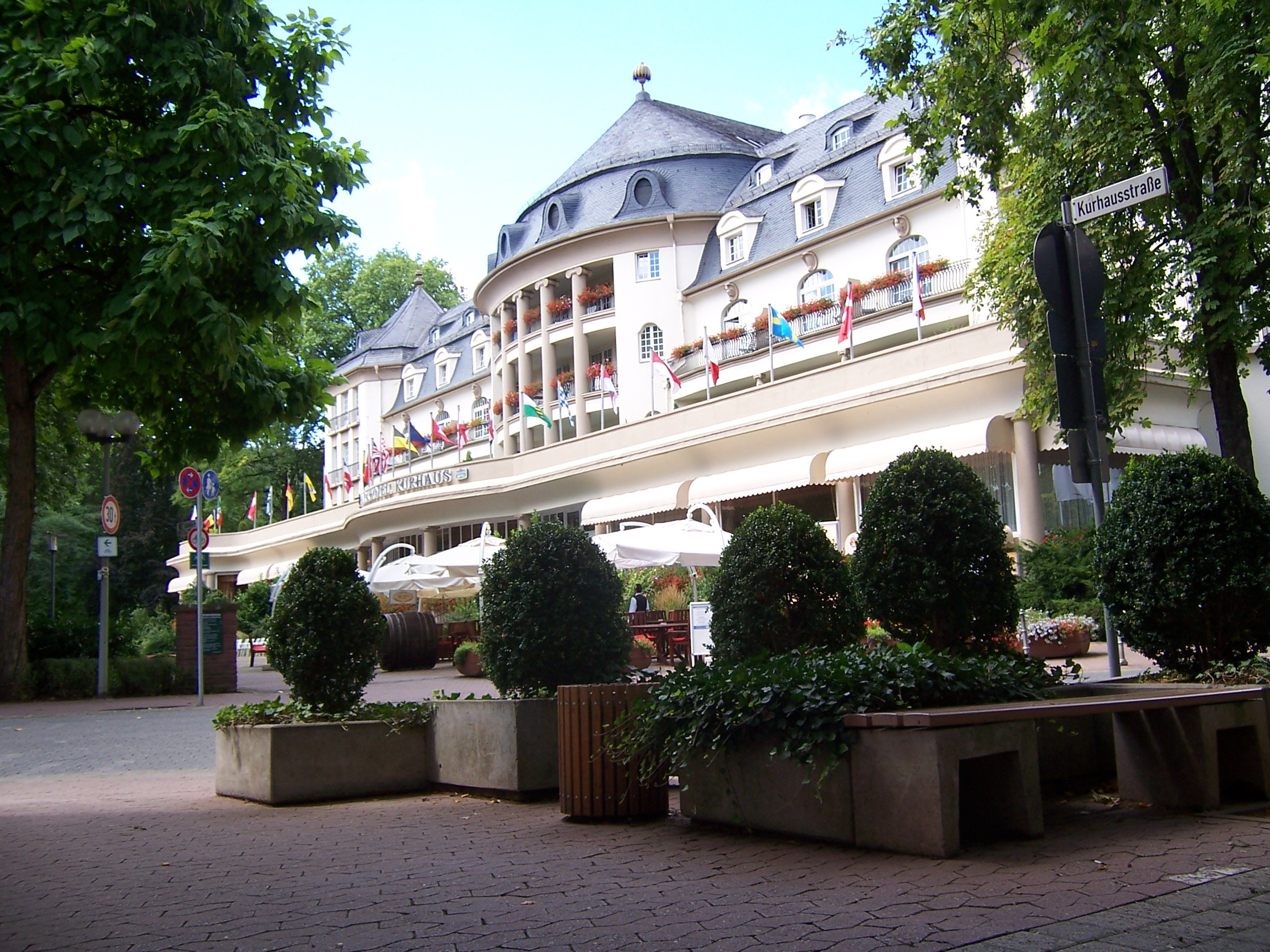
The Parkhotel in Kreuznach, headquarters of the Oberste Heeresleitung, hosted the conference of October 7, 1917.

On October 7, 1917, a conference held in Kreuznach, then headquarters of the Oberste Heeresleitung (OHL, German High Command), brought together Reich Chancellor Georg Michaelis and State Secretary Richard von Kühlmann, under the chairmanship of Wilhelm II. During this meeting, the military set out their objectives for the war after three years of conflict, in a 24-point memorandum; they clashed with the civilians, firm supporters of the devolution of the Polish crown to a Habsburg archduke.

This 24-point program defines the new directions that the German military would like to see implemented in pursuit of their war aims. The Dioscuri aspired to place Austria-Hungary under the strict tutelage of the Reich for a period of twenty years, as part of a defensive and offensive military alliance, an extended customs union within the framework of the constitution of Mitteleuropa; furthermore, they wanted the Dual Monarchy to lose interest in Romania, in exchange for Poland. The German military also wanted to force the Habsburg monarchy to make a firm commitment to continue its involvement in the conflict until the Reich had won.

At the end of a heated exchange between civilians and the military, the Chancellor reached a compromise between the positions defended by the Dioscuri and those by the Secretary of State: the differences related more to the form that German preeminence in Europe should adopt than to its validity or geographical extension. Indeed, the participants in the October 7 meeting were in favor of resuming economic negotiations with the Dual Monarchy, with a view to concluding a customs union between the two empires.

=== The directives of October 22, 1917 ===
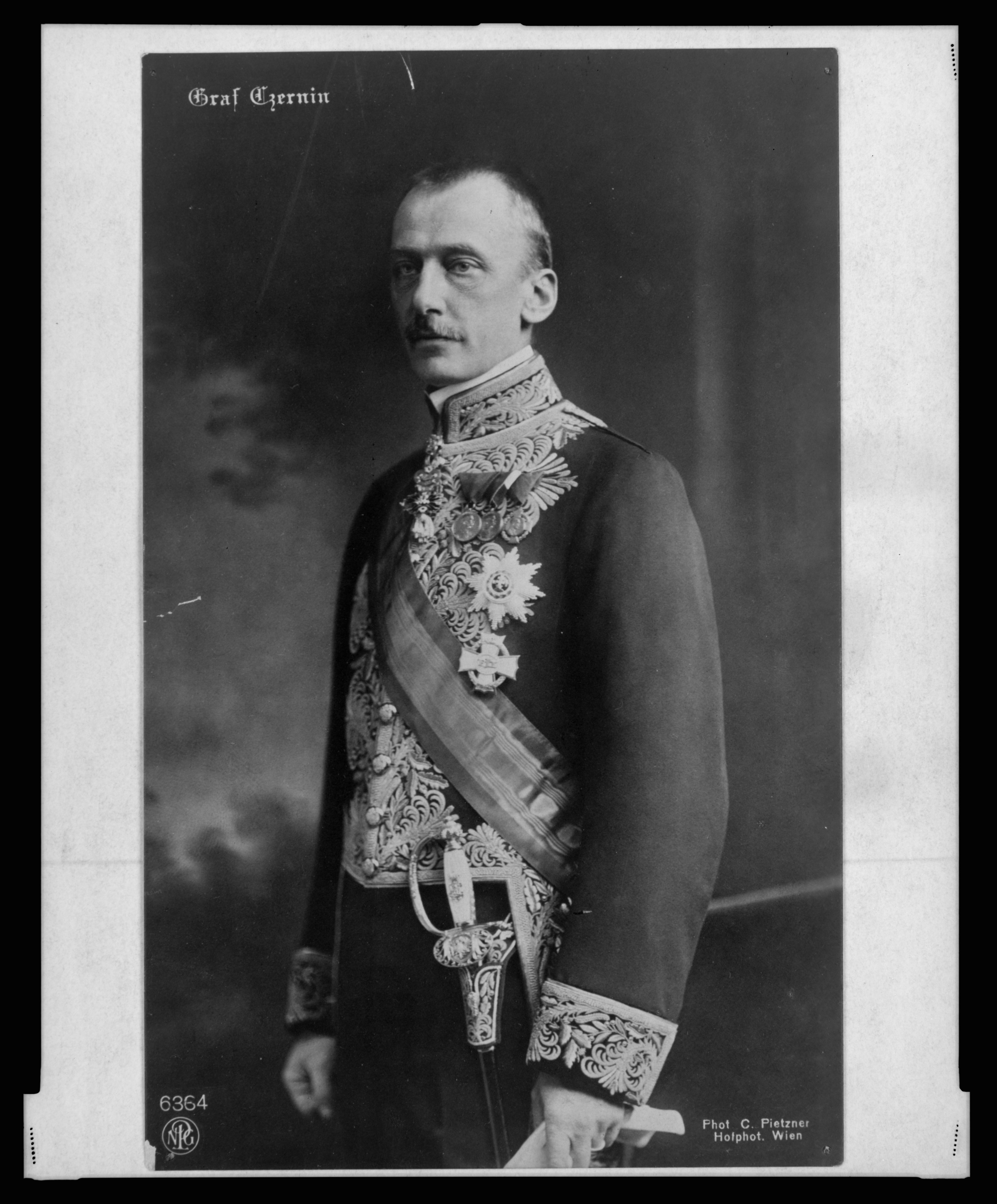
Ottokar Czernin, representing the Dual Monarchy in Berlin, accepted the terms of the Conference of Vienna of October 22, 1917.

During the fall of 1917, German representatives took every opportunity to redefine the terms of the agreements negotiated the previous May at Kreuznach, attempting to exchange Poland, promised to the Reich but divided into German and Austro-Hungarian zones of occupation, for Romania, promised to Austria-Hungary.

On October 22, 1917, Ottokar Czernin accepted, in the name of the Dual Monarchy, the "directives" proposed by Richard von Kühlmann at the end of a ministerial meeting in Vienna. Czernin recognized the validity of the German demands on Belgium, Courland and Lithuania, while committing the German government "not to stand in the way of a peaceful solution in the West"; in exchange, Czernin managed to negotiate the maintenance of some of the Dual Monarchy's political, economic and commercial positions in the Polish regency, which was largely under German control. (Note: Poland, a battleground for Austro-German rivalries, was divided into two zones of occupation, one German and the other Austro-Hungarian.)

In exchange for the strengthening and perpetuation of ties between the Reich and the Dual Monarchy, the Germans were prepared to surrender the Polish throne to a Habsburg archduke, Charles Stephen, or even to accept the political integration of the kingdom in the process of being formed into the Dual Monarchy. Nevertheless, this surrender was largely superficial: the agreements between the Kingdom of Poland and the Reich guaranteed a "simple personal union without legal connection" between Poland and the Dual Monarchy, but placed the restored kingdom under strict German political and economic control.

== Participants ==
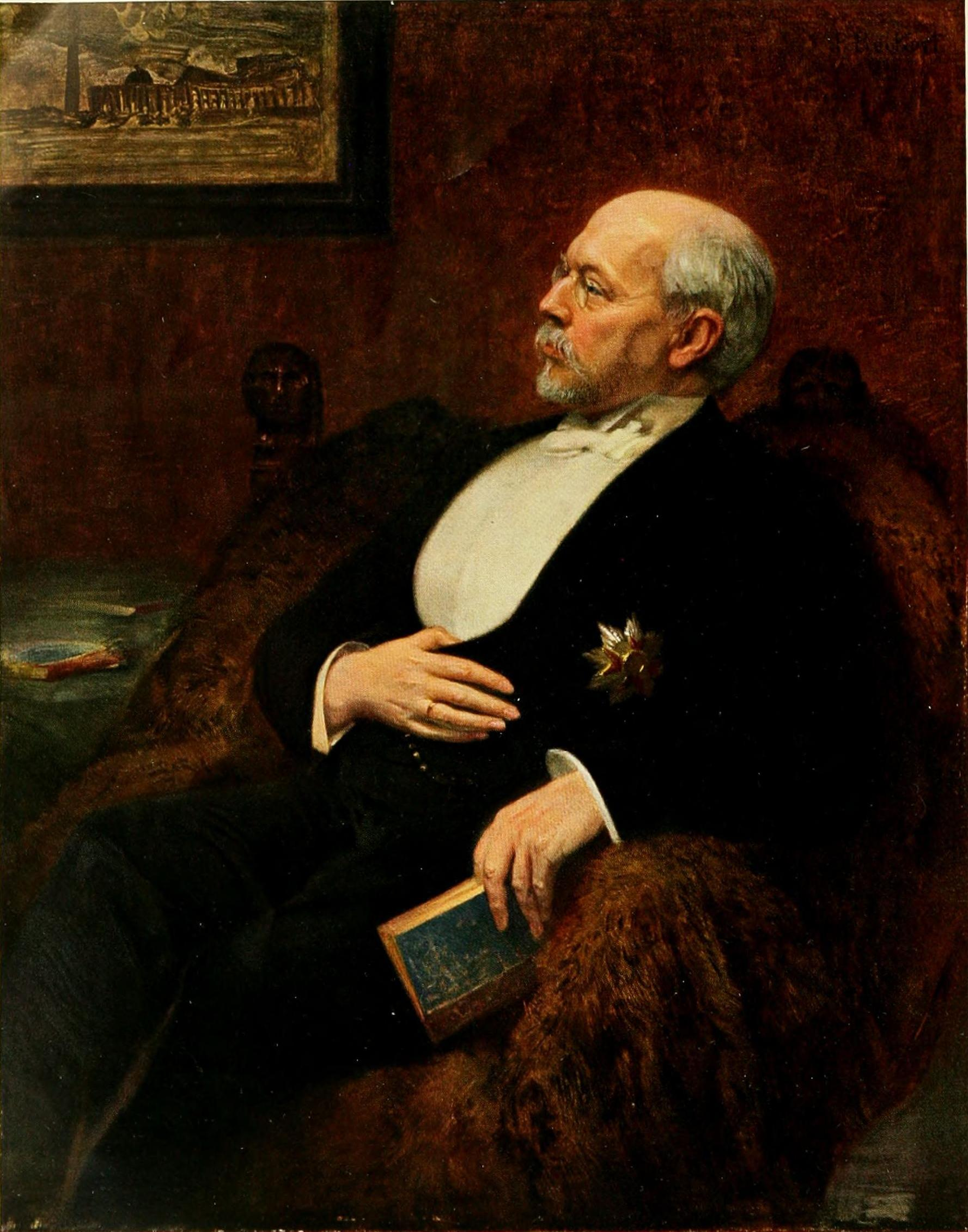
Georg von Hertling, pictured here in 1908, prepares the conference on behalf of the Reich.

The Berlin Conference actually consisted of several governmental meetings chaired by Georg von Hertling, the new Reich Chancellor and Minister-President of the Kingdom of Prussia. Initially attended by members of the governments of the main federal states (Note: Within the Reich established by Bismarck, the 39 federal states enjoyed considerable internal autonomy.) and the German military, the conference was later opened up to Austro-Hungarian representatives.

=== German negotiators ===
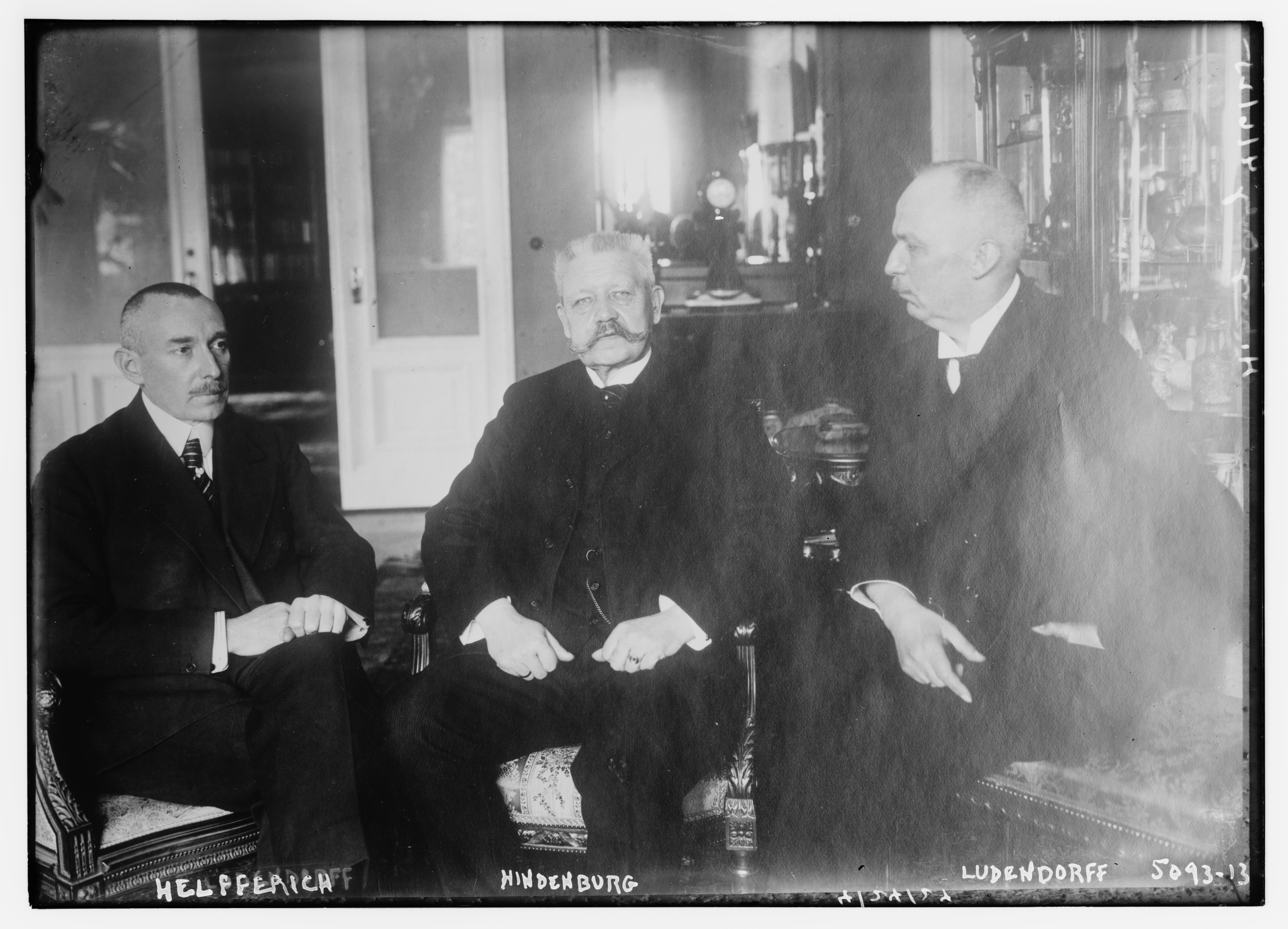
Karl Helfferich, Paul von Hindenburg and Erich Ludendorff, pictured here in 1915, took an active part in this meeting.

The conference was prepared by Georg von Hertling, the new Reich Chancellor, and his Vice-Chancellor, Karl Helfferich, under the strict supervision of Richard von Kühlmann and the military Dioscuri, Paul von Hindenburg and Erich Ludendorff, who were present in Berlin for the duration of the talks, despite the hostility of the Reichstag deputies.

The head of the German delegation, Hermann Johannes, Director of Economic Affairs of the Auswärtiges Amt, was judged to be too timid, and was quickly sidelined by the Vice-Chancellor, Karl Helfferich, and the German Ambassador in Vienna, Botho von Wedel. After some political scheming, Hermann Johannes was replaced by his colleague, the diplomat Paul Koerner, who was fully committed to the Vice-Chancellor's economic plans and had a reputation for great skill in trade negotiations.

Vice-Chancellor Karl Helfferich chaired the meeting with the Austro-Hungarian negotiators, which opened on November 5, but he proved powerless in the face of the wide divergence between the Germans and the Austro-Hungarians on the question of war aims.

Also present at the German Crown Council was Otto von Dandler, the last Minister-President of the Kingdom of Bavaria.

=== Austro-Hungarian negotiators ===
The presence of Ottokar Czernin, Foreign Minister of the Dual Monarchy and announced after October 22, in Berlin on November 5, 1917, prompted Chancellor Georg Michaelis to propose postponing for a few days the German-Austro-Hungarian talks originally scheduled for October 29 and 30, 1917.

== Negotiations ==
=== The continuation of the war ===
The Chancellor, Georg von Hertling, and the military attempted to reinforce for the benefit of the Reich the arrangements previously negotiated with the Dual Monarchy at Kreuznach on October 7, and to obtain Austro-Hungarian agreement to revise the terms of the Kreuznach agreements from May.

Thus, on November 3 and 4, before the arrival of the Austro-Hungarian negotiators, an agreement was reached among the German participants at the conference: they proposed continuing the conflict "until the German war aims are achieved", which Czernin accepted on his arrival in Berlin on November 5.

=== Reaffirmation of war aims ===
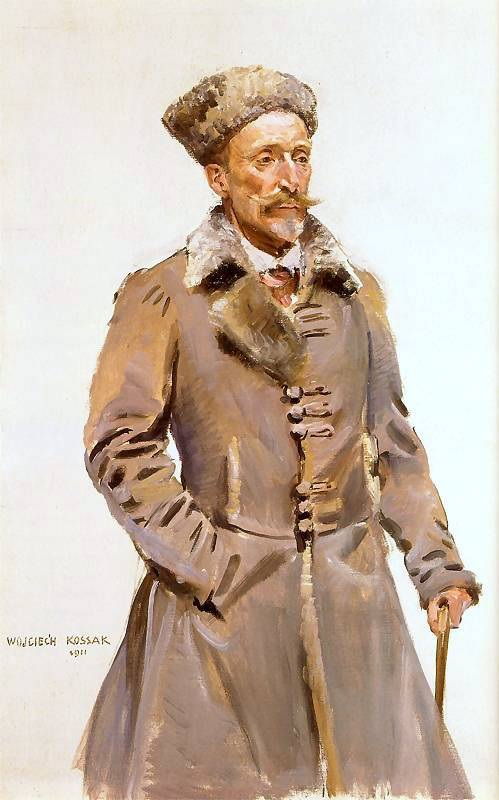
The devolution of the Polish crown to Archduke Charles Stephen, portrayed here by Wojciech Kossak, did not call into question German control over the restored kingdom.

From November 2 onwards, the Reich's political and military leaders focused their debates on the question of the war aims of the Reich and its allies, both territorial war aims and the economic and commercial conditions for ending the conflict.

Since the end of 1915, the respective places of Belgium and Poland in the structure of Mitteleuropa have been the main focus of Austro-German governmental conferences.

The High Command and the government demanded guarantees which, in exchange for the evacuation of the country by German troops, called into question any real independence for the Belgian kingdom. Negotiations between German officials confirmed the conclusions of the September 1917 talks: Belgium, although independent, was in fact promised strict economic supervision by the Reich. (Note: This project of economic control was strengthened during the winter of 1917-1918.) Finally, the integrity of the formally independent kingdom would be guaranteed by the Reich,21 while the Belgian army would be more of a militia than a genuine national army.

Another apple of discord between the Reich and the Dual Monarchy was the devolution of Russian Poland and the borders of the new kingdom. Negotiations focused on the border strip annexed to the Reich and the delineation of the new frontier: the German negotiators demanded a border modification for Prussia such that a third of the Congress Kingdom fo Poland would be annexed to the Reich, calling into question any possibility of real independence for the restored kingdom. On November 4, Prussian ministers set out their demands in Poland: independent and formally vested in the Habsburg-Lorraine family, restored Poland was in reality placed under the strict control of the Reich. The new kingdom had to cede a wide border strip to the Reich, with a total surface area equivalent to a third of the Congress kingdom, while the canals and railroads were placed under Prussian control through the acquisition of a majority shareholding in the companies concerned; similarly, the new kingdom's central bank, which was supposed to issue the Polish marka, was derived from the deposit bank already operating in the territories administered by the Reich. The harsh reality of this control was barely called into question by the devolution of the Polish throne to a cousin of Emperor-King Charles, Archduke Charles Stephen, the Austrian "cherry on top" of the Polish cake.

=== Direct or indirect control? ===
Since the outbreak of the war, different conceptions have shaped the Reich's war aims. Some German officials, mainly members of the Imperial Cabinet, (Note: These men developed ideas close to those of Theobald von Bethmann Hollweg, Reich Chancellor until July 13, 1917.) advocated strong economic control over the territories the Reich wished to control; others, close to the military and the nationalist right, advocated straightforward annexation of these territories.

The civilian members of the Reich government tried to force the Dioscuri to implement a strategy based on the indirect control of the European continent. The choice was driven by dual pressure: from Vienna, to get out of the conflict, and from the Reichstag, aware of the impossibility of justifying the continuation of the war by the pursuit of vast annexations.

Faced with this disagreement over the form German hegemony in Europe should take, Wilhelm II did not make his position clear, allowing the crisis to develop until the summer of 1918: indeed, on July 2, 1918, in Spa, he arbitrated between the different positions, showing himself to be in favor of the establishment of an indirect, economic control by the Reich over formally independent states.

== Outcome ==
=== German Chimeras ===
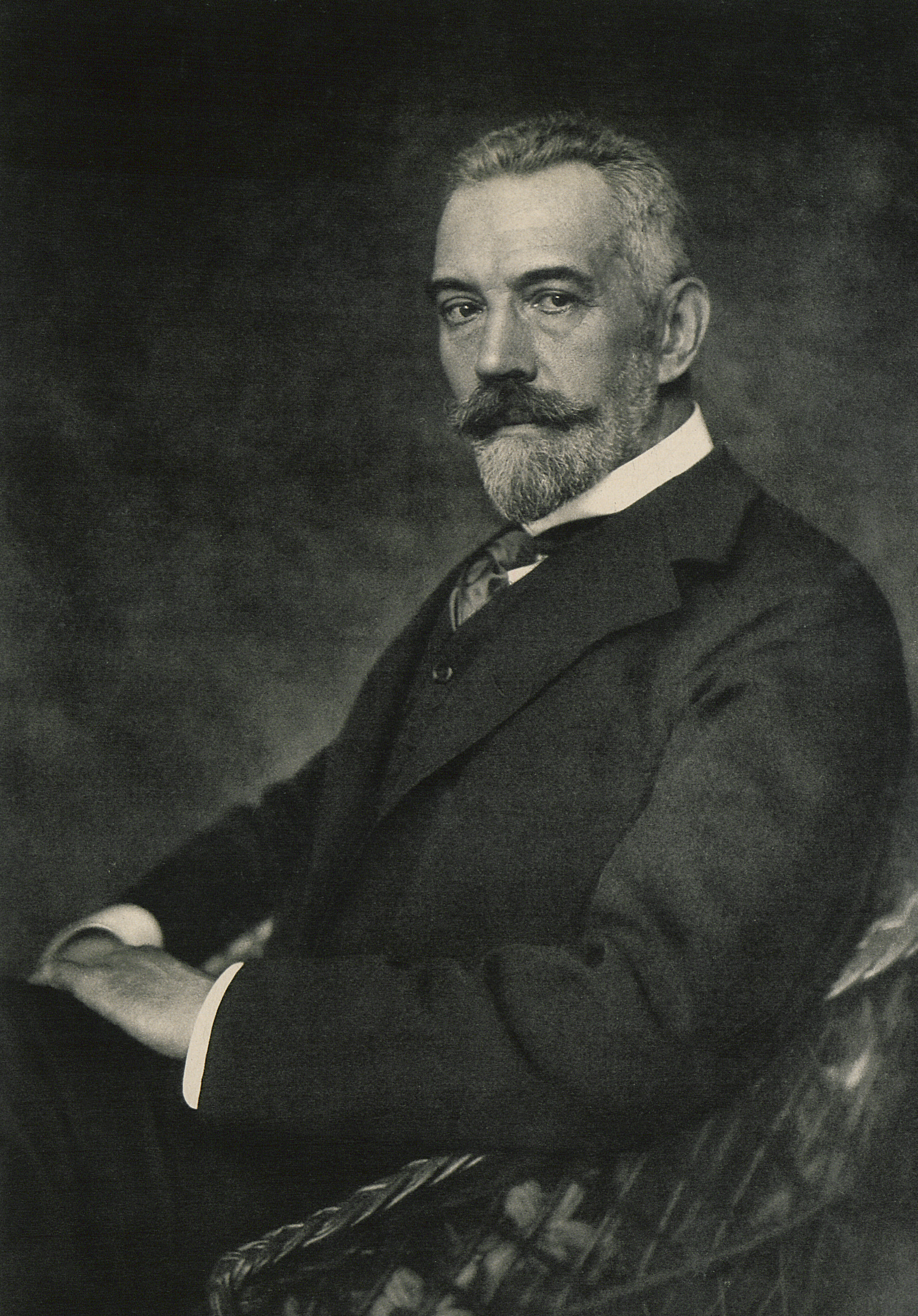
The conclusions of the Berlin conference confirmed the war aims defined by Theobald von Bethmann Hollweg (shown here in 1914) in September 1914.

On the eve of the October Revolution, the Reich's political and military leaders expanded the war aims they wished to see achieved for their country, even if this program appeared unrealistic at this stage of the conflict. However, the regime change in Russia gave the promoters of this maximalist program hope of its realization.

The German program, based on the 24 points negotiated on October 7 at Kreuznach, was reformulated into thirteen points. This program of the Reich's war aims, presented to the Austro-Hungarians, reiterated and deepened the arrangements enacted by Theobald von Bethmann Hollweg on September 9, 1914.

At the talks held on November 2, 3 and 4, 1917, both military and civilian leaders agreed to strengthen German control over Poland, which had been formally handed over to the Dual Monarchy. However, this reinforcement, like the wide border strip promised to be annexed by the Reich, aroused the hostility of the Austro-Hungarian negotiators, who advocated a Polish state integrated into Austrian Galicia.

=== Maintenance of the Kreuznach arrangements ===
Despite attacks from Paul von Hindenburg and Erich Ludendorff, the two Dioscuri, Hertling and his immediate collaborators managed to defend the outcome of the April 23rd agreements, wresting from the military an agreement mentioning a reduced annexation perimeter. (Note: Until then, the Dioscuri had been opposed to any policy of indirect control of the Reich's neighboring regions.)

Finally, the formulation of the program of war aims proposed by the Reich's representatives prompted the Austro-Hungarian representative to reject the German proposals, the fruit of a compromise negotiated within the German Crown Council upon his arrival in the Reich's capital on November 5. This categorical refusal enabled him to successfully defend the outcome of the previous spring's negotiations, under the terms of the joint German-Austro-Hungarian memorandum of June 18, 1917: Poland and the Baltic states remained assigned to the Reich, while Serbia, Montenegro, Albania and Romania belonged to the dual monarchy.

== See also ==
- German Empire
- History of Austria-Hungary during World War I
- Kingdom of Poland (1917–1918)
- Wilhelm II
- Georg von Hertling
- Richard von Kühlmann
- Ottokar Czernin
- Berlin Conference (March 26-27, 1917)
