= Berlin Conference (March 31, 1917) =

German war planning meeting during WWI

Berlin Conference (March 31, 1917) Conférence de Berlin (31 mars 1917)
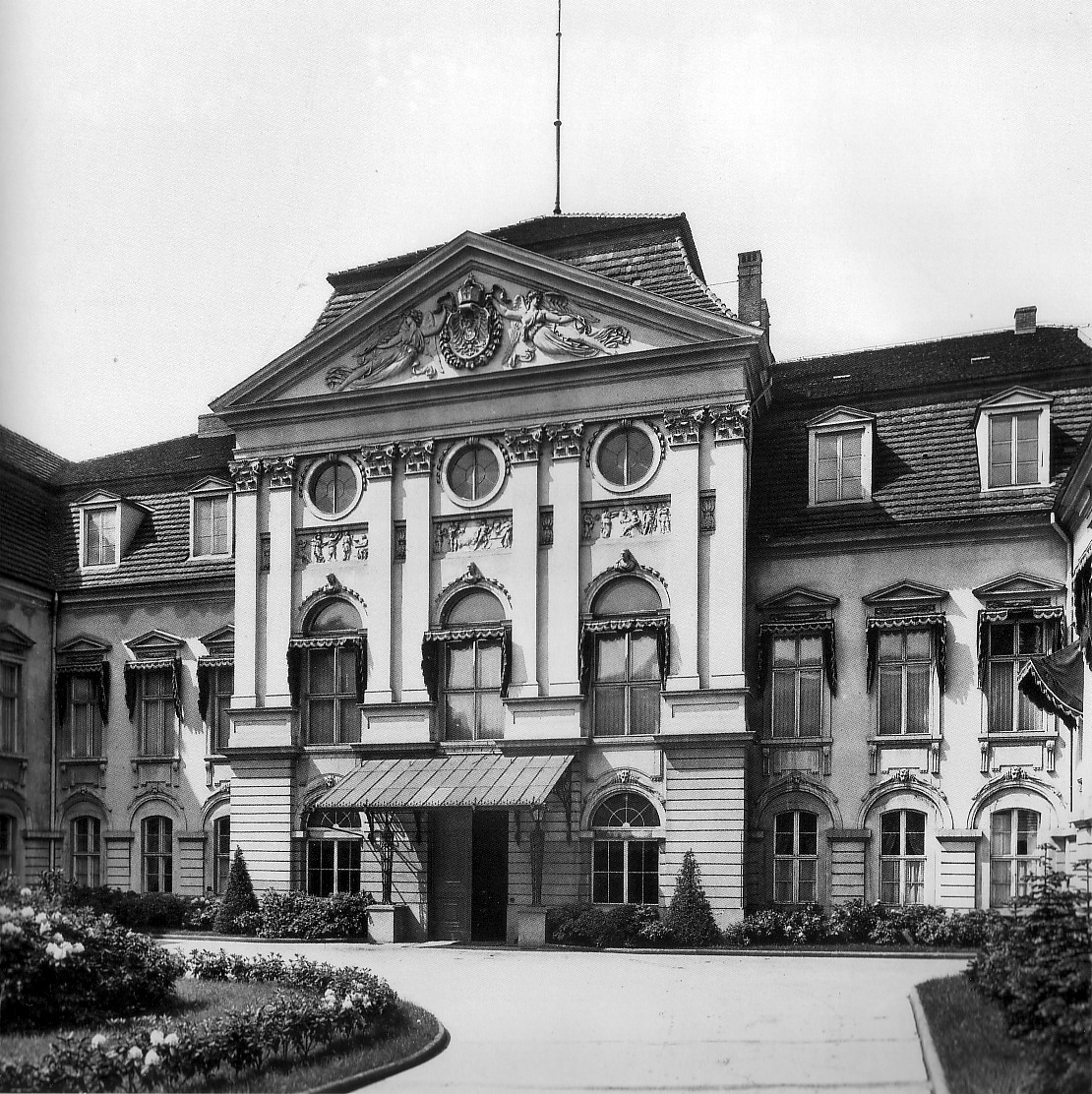
- The Reich Chancellery in 1910.
- Genre: Strategy meeting
- Date: 31 March 1917
- Location: Berlin
- Country: German Empire
- Participants: Theobald von Bethmann Hollweg Arthur Zimmermann Paul von Hindenburg Erich Ludendorff Max Hoffmann

The Berlin Conference of March 31, 1917, was a German governmental meeting designed to define a new direction for the Imperial Reich's (Note: Between the proclamation of the German Empire in 1871 and its dissolution in 1945, the official name of the German state was Deutsches Reich, subsequently referred to by the legal term Reich.) war aims in Eastern Europe. Called by the Chancellor of the Reich, this meeting brought together members of the civilian government and officials of the Oberste Heeresleitung to establish the principles that should guide Reich policy in response to the political changes occurring in Russia, which had recently undergone the definitive fall of the monarchy. As a major driving force behind the Central Powers the Reich recognized the need for a clear and objective plan moving forward. For the Reich, the Russian Revolution presented a possibility to impose severe peace terms on Russia and approve extreme initiatives.

== Context ==
=== The Reich and the Russian Revolution ===
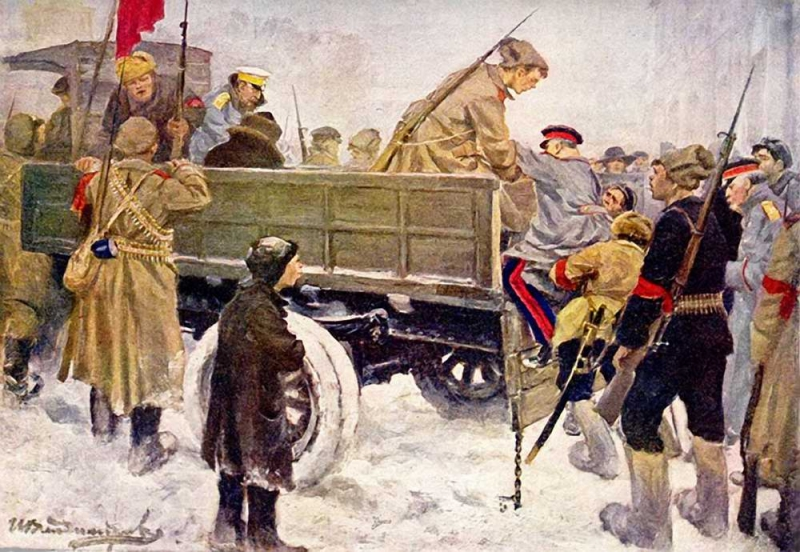
In 1917, the Russian army was permanently weakened by the arrest of officers (Ivan Vladimirov painting).

The February Revolution halted military operations on the Eastern Front temporarily. However, the Russian provisional government's loyalty to the alliances made with the previous regime required the Reich and its allies to maintain a significant number of divisions on the ground to confront the Russian troops. During March, Arthur Zimmermann, the German Foreign Minister, received fragmented updates on political events in Russia, specifically the monarch's overthrow. The Reich Chancellor, Theobald von Bethmann Hollweg, and the Dioscuri (World War I), Paul von Hindenburg and Erich Ludendorff, (Note: Inseparable from each other in the eyes of German public opinion, these two soldiers were likened to the Dioscuri of mythology by war propaganda.) became convinced that negotiations for peace with the Russian Provisional Government would commence, assuring the Reich and its allies of a "satisfactory peace." On March 27, the Provisional Government announced its intention to continue the war on the side of the Allies under the leadership of its President, Georgi Lvov.

Although the Russian government remained loyal to the Triple Entente, it lacked the willingness to engage in ambitious military operations due to the revolution and ensuing unrest, which had temporarily rendered the Russian army unable to operate.

Aware of this reality, the Quadruple Alliance military planners promptly redeployed their armies to Italy, the Balkans, and the western front, which had hitherto been engaged in the East.

=== Pushing back Russia ===
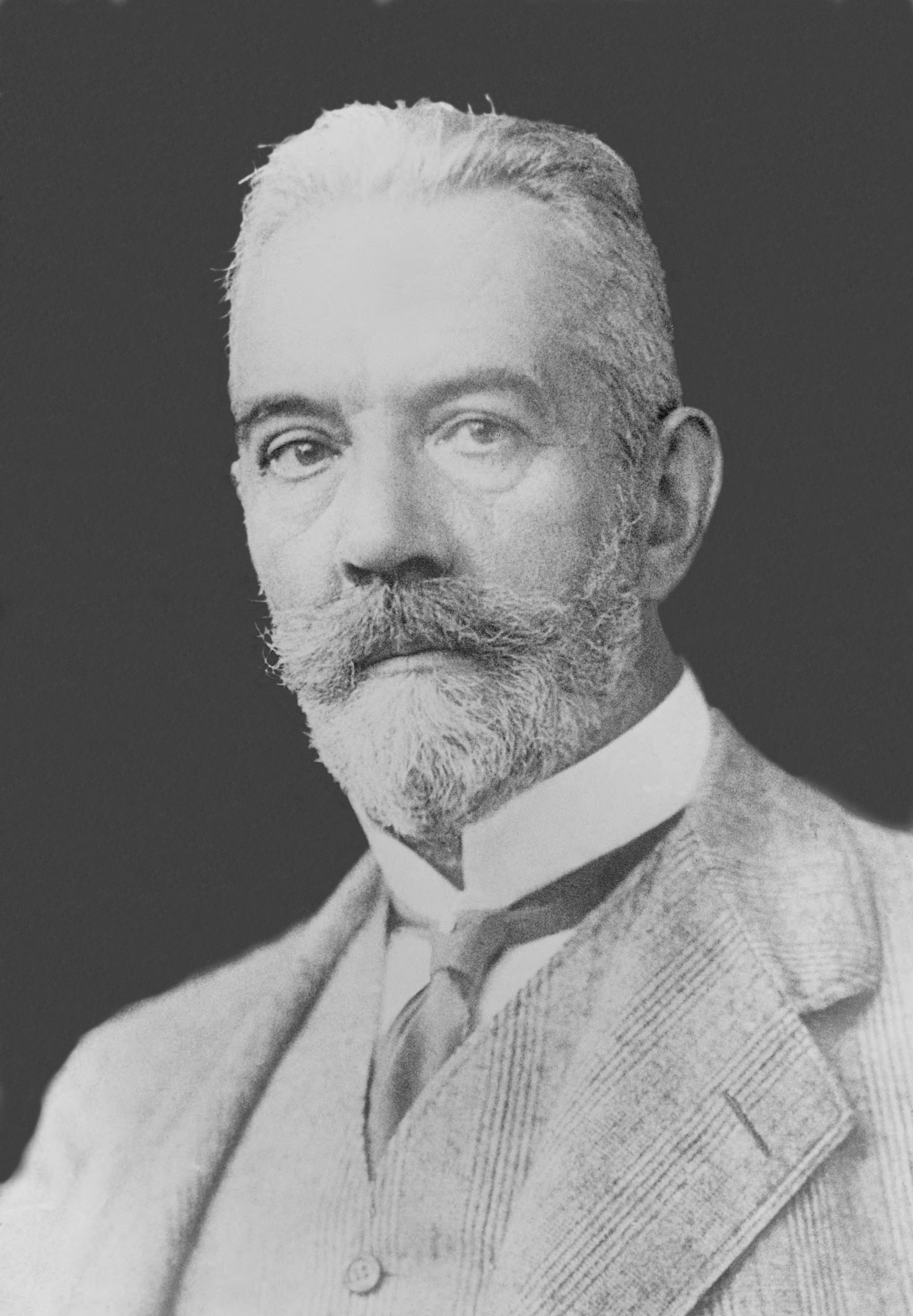
Reich Chancellor Theobald von Bethmann Hollweg, pictured here in 1917, wanted the Reich to control Russia's western margins.

Since its inception, the leaders of the German Empire have been confronted with the strategic challenge of waging war on two fronts, against France and Russia.

To mitigate the negative effects of this simultaneous dual confrontation, German diplomats proposed the creation of buffer states along the non-Russian borders of the Tsarist empire. This would provide the Reich and its allies with protection against Russia and enhance its strategic depth.

Thus, from the outset of the conflict, Reich Chancellor Theobald von Bethmann Hollweg favored the Reich's control over non-Russian territories in the European part of the Russian Empire. This was ostensibly done to "keep Russia as far away from the German border as possible" and cloaked in the guise of emancipation. Chancellor Bethmann Hollweg and his ministers in September 1914 selected the regions to be controlled at Russia's expense, including Finland, the Baltic states, Poland, and Ukraine up to Rostov-on-Don.

== Participants ==
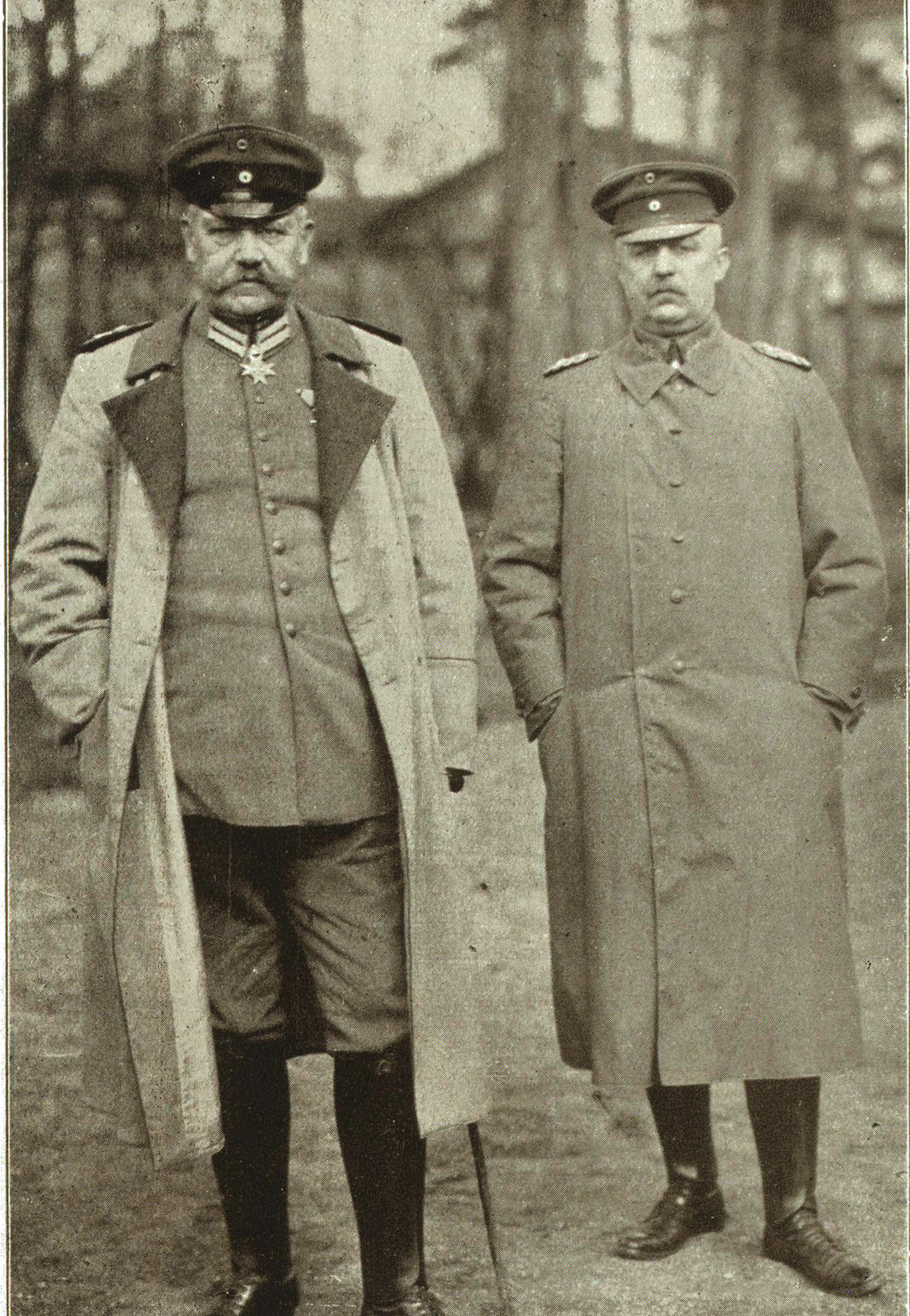
Paul von Hindenburg and Erich Ludendorff, pictured here in January 1917, attend the conference.

Reich Chancellor Theobald von Bethmann Hollweg did not physically attend the conference, but it was opened and closed on his behalf by Arthur Zimmermann, State Secretary for Foreign Affairs, and his principal collaborators.

The military command, led by the Dioscuri, Paul von Hindenburg and Erich Ludendorff, and their deputy Max Hoffmann, who was known as the "essential man of the East" and was the main organizer of the Eastern Front, was also in attendance. (Note: Max Hoffmann was subsequently the main German negotiator of the peace treaties with Russia and Ukraine, signed a year later.)

== Discussions ==
=== Civil-military differences ===
Although the desire to neutralize Russia was acute, the participants were unable to reach a consensus on the feasibility of dispatching additional pacifist agitators to Russia. As of March 27th, multiple trains containing Bolshevik and Menshevik leaders, such as Lenin and Julius Martov, had already departed Switzerland for Russia with the Reich's approval.

Thus, at this meeting, two factions emerged, with one advocating for the long-term destabilization of Russia and the other favoring its weaker status, ensured by a peace treaty. The military, backed by nationalists and pangermists, aimed to close the Eastern Front without regard for the costs. Meanwhile, the Reich Chancellor, supported by a majority of parties in the Reichstag, sought to initiate negotiations with the new Russian power in order to safeguard the conquered territories in Poland and the Baltic states.

=== Irreconcilable differences ===
In this context, the differences actually obscured the profound schisms between the pangermanists and nationalists, on one side, and the proponents of a particular realism, on the other, which were exacerbated by the conflict.

Within this context, the military, supported by Pangermanist factions, openly declared their desire for a maximal expansionist agenda, pressuring the Reich and its allies to aim for total victory in the war against their opponents, precisely when such a victory appeared increasingly unlikely.

Bethmann-Hollweg, his advisors, and the majority he relied on in the Reichstag during the hostilities aimed to establish restricted objectives for the conflict. Their objective was to enable a diplomatic resolution, but without attaining complete triumph over the opposing alliance.

== Decisions ==
=== Neutralizing Russia ===
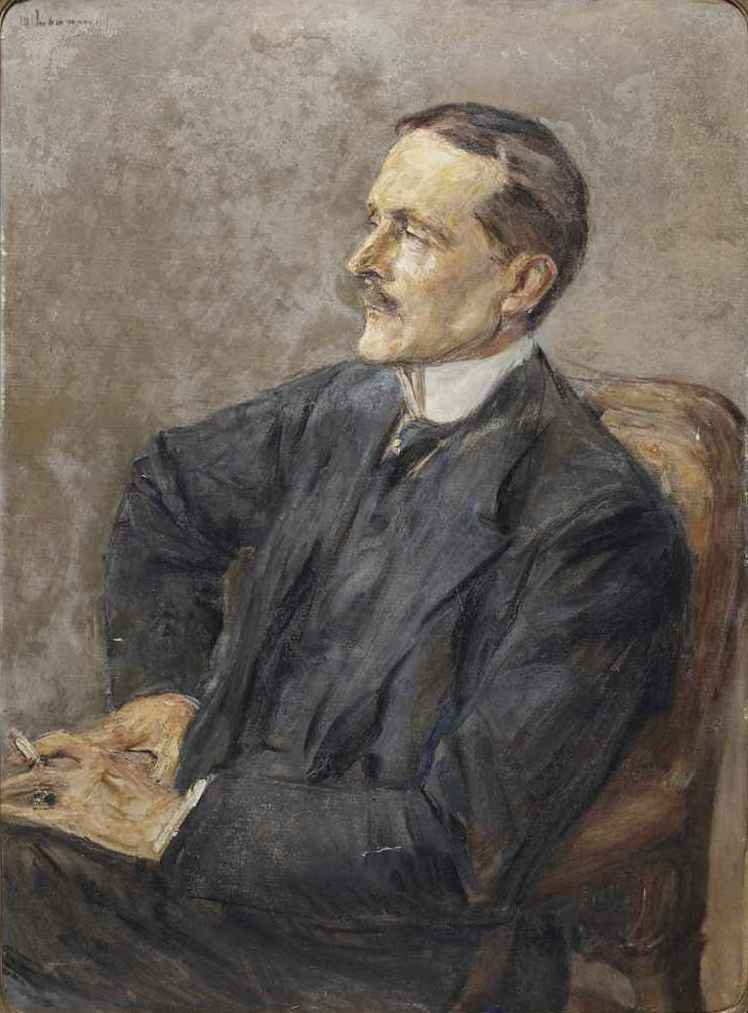
Diplomat Ulrich von Brockdorff-Rantzau, architect of the Bolsheviks' return to Russia (portrait by Max Liebermann).

In Berlin, the Reich government and their main collaborators aimed to remove Russia from the conflict.

Following Ulrich von Brockdorff-Rantzau's advice, while posted in Denmark, Arthur Zimmermann obtained the Chancellor's authorization not only to encourage pacifist propaganda in Russia but also to facilitate the return of the Bolsheviks. This was done in order to "aggravate the dissensions between moderates and extremists". (Note: In the words of Ulrich von Brockdorff-Rantzau's letter to his minister.) In this context, German representatives in Switzerland negotiated with Lenin to establish the terms of his return. They guaranteed his political independence from the Reich government and provided subsidies to support his pacifist efforts.

In tandem with this subversive action, diplomats convinced the military to refrain from any more large-scale actions on the Russian front to avoid a reaction from the army. The diplomats recommended that the German army multiply small-scale operations. By doing so, they hoped to gradually exhaust the Russian army without inciting a nationalist uprising in Russia. Furthermore, they aimed to strengthen the supporters of a negotiated peace among the members of the new government in Petrograd.

=== Colonial projects ===
At the meeting, the maps of the Baltic States were assessed and the group developed a draft territorial plan for German colonization of Lithuania and the Curonian Spit.

Two projects were formulated, the first proposing extensive programs to remove the Baltic populations and resettle Reich Germans in their place, while the second focused on "soft Germanization" to gradually integrate the Balts into the German population. The civilian population adhered to the Bismarckian tradition, with the explicit goal of assimilating the Poles and Balts in the region into the Reich. In contrast, Ludendorff pursued a colonial and racist agenda that aimed to establish Germanic agricultural communities in the same regions.

At this point in the conflict, the projects were not fully developed and sparked heated discussions between civilians who supported integrating the Baltic populations and the military, particularly Erich Ludendorff, who endorsed extensive expulsions as a precursor to German settlement in the Baltic countries.

=== Ethnic cleansing ===
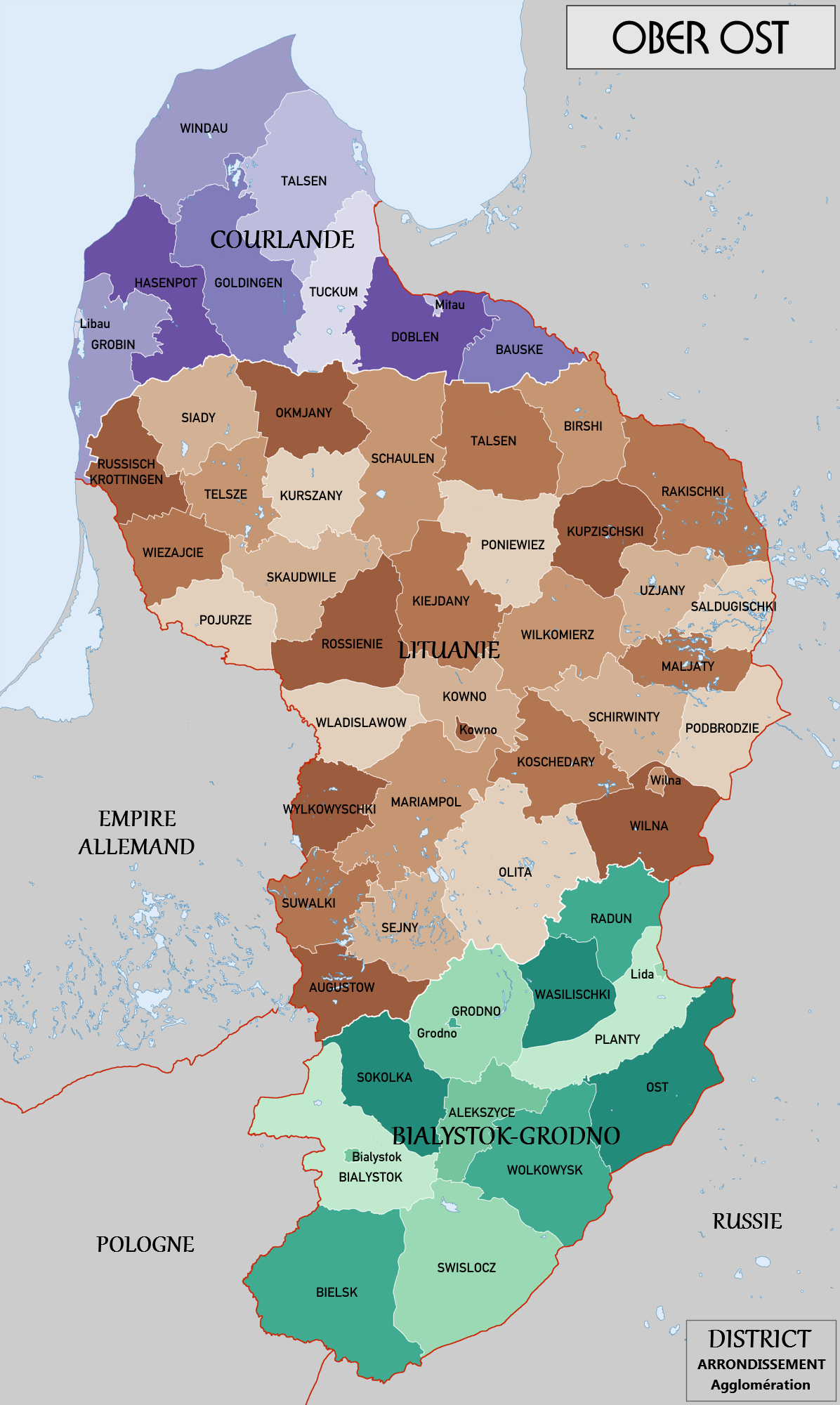
Ludendorff wanted to carry out ethnic cleansing in the Ober Ost territories.

For the first time, the German leaders at the gathering conceived of the removal of significant Slavic and Baltic populations as a prerequisite for colonizing the Baltic regions already under the control of the Reich's armies. (Note: In the words of Fritz Ficher.) Erich Ludendorff's expansionist aspirations heavily influenced this agenda, with the added objective of establishing an expulsion timetable.

The participants aimed to Germanize the Baltic region, intending to force out the Baltic and Slav populations from previous regimes in Estonia, Livonia, and Ober Ost following the war's conclusion.

However, the military rejected this proposal. Ludendorff, who was accompanied by many Baltic Germans, advocated for initiating an ambitious colonial program expeditiously. He proposed the mass expulsion of Baltic and Slav populations in a true "ethnic cleansing" (Note: In 1970, when the French translation of Fritz Fischer's book was published, the expression "ethnic cleansing" did not have the same meaning as in 2019.) fashion as a requirement for Germanization. Furthermore, the First Quartermaster General (Note: Since August 29, 1916, Erich Ludendorff has held the title of First Quartermaster General of the German Army.) urged that a timetable be established for these extensive population transfers.

== See also ==
=== Bibliography ===
- ^{(fr)} Christian Baechler, Guerre et extermination à l'Est: Hitler et la conquête de l'espace vital. 1933-1945, Paris, Tallandier, 2012, 524 p. (ISBN 978-2-84734-906-1).
- ^{(fr)} Fritz Fischer (trad. Geneviève Migeon and Henri Thiès), Les Buts de guerre de l’Allemagne impériale (1914-1918) ["Griff nach der Weltmacht"], Paris, Éditions de Trévise, 1970, 654 p. (BNF 35255571).
- ^{(fr)} Hélène Carrère d'Encausse, Lénine, Fayard, 1998, 684 p. (ISBN 978-2-213-60162-5).
- ^{(fr)} Jean-Claude Laparra and Pascal Hesse, L'envers des parades: Le commandement de l'armée allemande: réalités et destins croisés 1914-1918, Paris, 14-18 éditions, 2011, 388 p. (ISBN 978-2-916385-77-8).
- ^{(fr)} Jean Lopez and Lasha Otkhmezuri, Barbarossa: 1941. La guerre absolue, Paris, Passés composés, 2019, 957 p. (ISBN 978-2-37933-186-2).
- (fr) Annie Lacroix-Riz, Le Vatican, l'Europe et le Reich de la Première Guerre mondiale à la Guerre Froide (1914-1955), Paris, Armand Colin, coll. « Références » Histoire, 1996 ISBN 978-2-200242-92-3.
- ^{(fr)} Pierre Renouvin, La Crise européenne et la Première Guerre mondiale, Paris, Presses universitaires de France, coll. "Peuples et civilisations" (no 19), 1934, 779 p. (BNF 33152114).
- Robert Service, Lenin: a biography, Pan Books, 2000, 561 p. (ISBN 978-0-330-51838-3).
- ^{(fr)} Georges-Henri Soutou, L'Or et le sang: Les buts de guerre économiques de la Première Guerre mondiale, Paris, Fayard, 1989, 963 p. (ISBN 2-213-02215-1).

=== Related articles ===
- German Empire
- Eastern Front (World War I)
- February Revolution
- Drang nach Osten
- Berlin Conference (March 26-27, 1917)
