= Kreuznach Conferences =

Series of military meetings in 1917

The Kreuznach Conferences refers to a series of conferences held in 1917 in Bad Kreuznach, then the headquarters of the Oberste Heeresleitung (OHL), the German Supreme Army Command.

The first conference, held on April 23, 1917, brought together the political and military leaders of the Reich to define the war aims of the Reich, which was then occupying a significant portion of Europe.

The second conference, held between May 17 and 18, 1917, was a meeting between the German Emperor, Wilhelm II, and the Austrian Emperor, King of Hungary Charles. This was the first meeting between the two leaders since the enthronement of the Austro-Hungarian monarch on November 22, 1916. The objective of this conference was to establish a unified framework for the Central Powers' policy.

The third conference, held on August 9, 1917, had the objective of defining German policy towards the dual monarchy in the wake of the publication of the Papal Note of August 1.

The fourth conference, convened on October 7, 1917, sought to define a new program of war aims. The final conference, held on December 19, 1917, focused on redefining the Reich's Eastern policy.
