= Berlin Conference (March 26-27, 1917) =

Meeting of Germany and Austria-Hungary

Berlin Conference (26–27 March 1917)
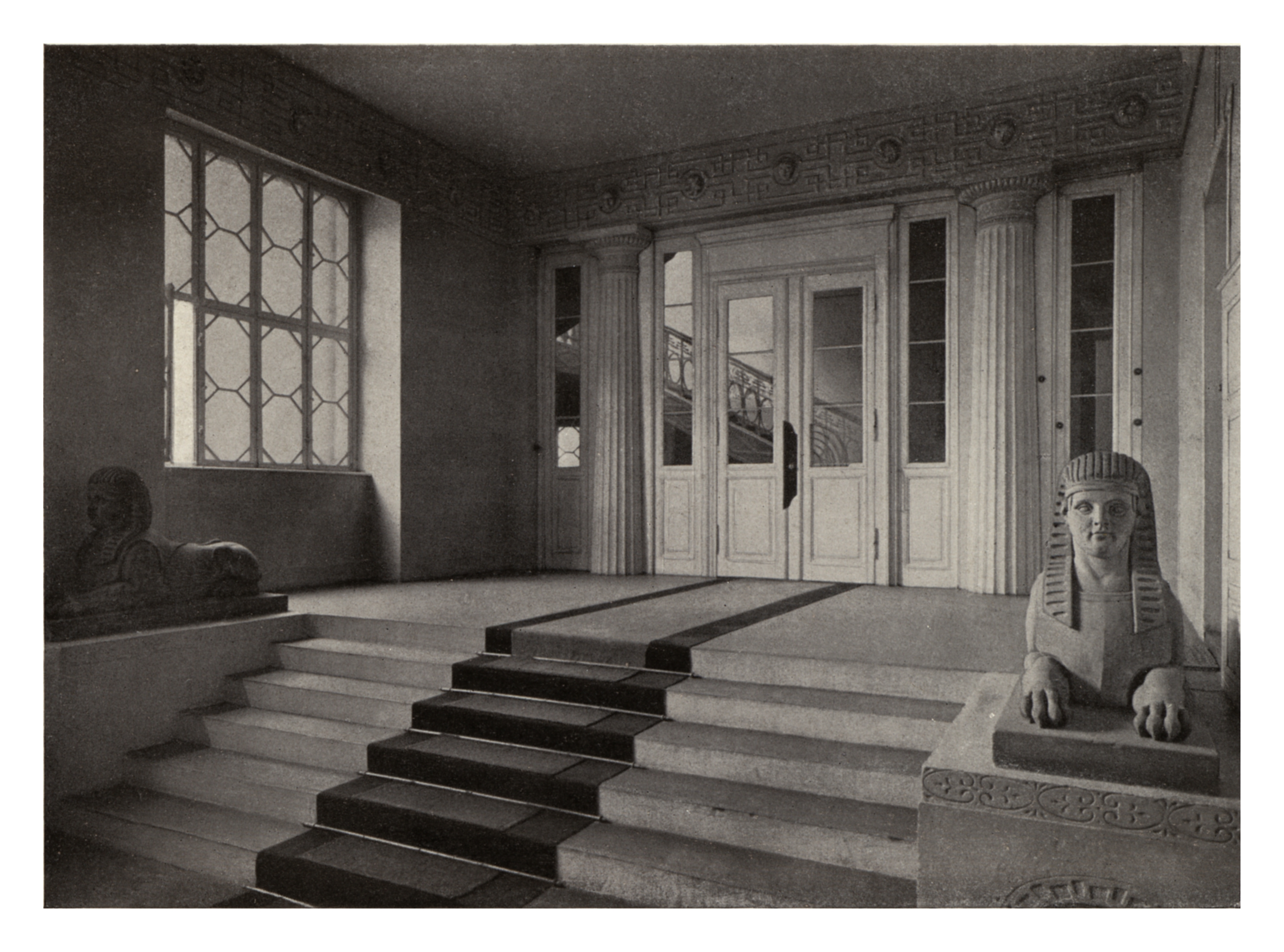
- Entrance hall of the German Foreign Office.
- Date: 26–27 March 1917
- Location: Berlin
- Type: Strategy meeting
- Participants: Theobald von Bethmann Hollweg; Arthur Zimmermann; Ottokar Czernin; Alexander Graf von Hoyos
- Outcome: Definition of a new war aims program of the Central Powers. (Note: From October 1915, Germany and its three allies were grouped together in an alliance known as Central Powers or the Quadruple Alliance.)

The Berlin Conference of 26–27 March 1917 was the second governmental meeting between Arthur Zimmermann and Ottokar Czernin, the German and Austro-Hungarian foreign ministers, under the chairmanship of Chancellor Theobald von Bethmann Hollweg. The meeting was intended to define the war aims of the Germany and the Austria-Hungary, and to prepare for the first official meeting between German Emperor Wilhelm II and the new Emperor-King Charles I. (Note: The two had officially met on several occasions since July 1914, but Charles was then only heir to the throne.) At a time when changes in political personnel were taking place in Austria-Hungary, which was becoming increasingly exhausted by the protracted conflict, this meeting was the first sign of disagreement between the two allies over the conditions for ending the conflict.

== Context ==
=== The Central Powers and the Russian Revolution ===
The February Revolution temporarily put an end to military operations on the Eastern Front; however, the Russian provisional government's decision to remain loyal to the alliances concluded by the imperial regime obliged the Germany and its allies to keep a large number of divisions on the ground to face the Russian troops.

Differences in interpretation of the events in Russia quickly led to incomprehension between the Germany and the Austria-Hungary. Austro-Hungarian officials interpreted the Russian revolutionary events of February as a desire for peace; moreover, faced with a tense domestic situation, both the German and Austro-Hungarian civilian populations could aspire to a revolution, a possible prelude to a rapid end to the conflict.

However, despite the new Russian government's determination to continue the war, the revolution and the resulting turmoil meant that the Russian Army's operational capabilities were temporarily lost; aware of this reality, German an Austrian-Hungarian military planners quickly redeployed part of their armies then engaged on the Eastern Front to Italy, the Balkans and the West.

=== War aims of the Central Powers ===
In response to an official German request made on 18 October 1916, Stephan Burián von Rajecz, then Austro-Hungarian Foreign Minister, sent a note on 5 November 1916, specifying Austria's war aims, in search of an "increase in power and security".

In the days that followed, the German ambassadors posted in Bulgaria and the Ottoman Empire sent the Bulgarian and Ottoman governments requests for clarification on the matter of war aims. Differences of opinion centered on the Bulgarian annexations and the compensation to be granted to the Ottomans and Austro-Hungarians. (Note: The Bulgarian government claimed Romanian Dobruja and the whole of Macedonia, at the expense of Greece and Serbia, without ceding any territory in the East Thrace to the Ottomans.)

On 1 January 1917, the German Chancellor, informed of these various programs, published the conditions for an equitable peace for Germany. The result of a compromise between civilians and the military, this program called for the annexation of the territories occupied by the Germany in Courland and Lithuania, the reconstitution of a Kingdom of Poland closely controlled by Germany, the annexation of the mining fields of French Lorraine and Belgium, and the return of the German colonies then occupied by the Allies.

=== Divergences between the Allies ===
The accession of Charles I in December 1916 did not seem to alter Austria-Hungary's management of the war, keen as it was to end its involvement in the conflict. Nevertheless, Charles did change the Austrian policy towards the Germany, no longer rallying unconditionally to German aspirations.

This aspiration to change the terms of the alliance between Germany and Austria-Hungary was reflected in Charles's desire to conclude a compromise peace with the Allies, based on the status quo; this political change appeared necessary in the eyes of the monarch and his entourage, aware of the general decay of the Dual Monarchy at the end of 30 months of conflict.

To negotiate the compromise peace desired by the Austro-Hungarian monarch, emissaries were sent to Switzerland in early February 1917 to meet diplomats representing neutral states; these meetings were intended to restore relations with France, which were initially informal and discreet. In reality, however, Austrian negotiators were maneuvered by Matthias Erzberger and Georg von Hertling, then Minister-President of the Kingdom of Bavaria, both of whom supported the continuation of the war until victory.

== Negotiators ==
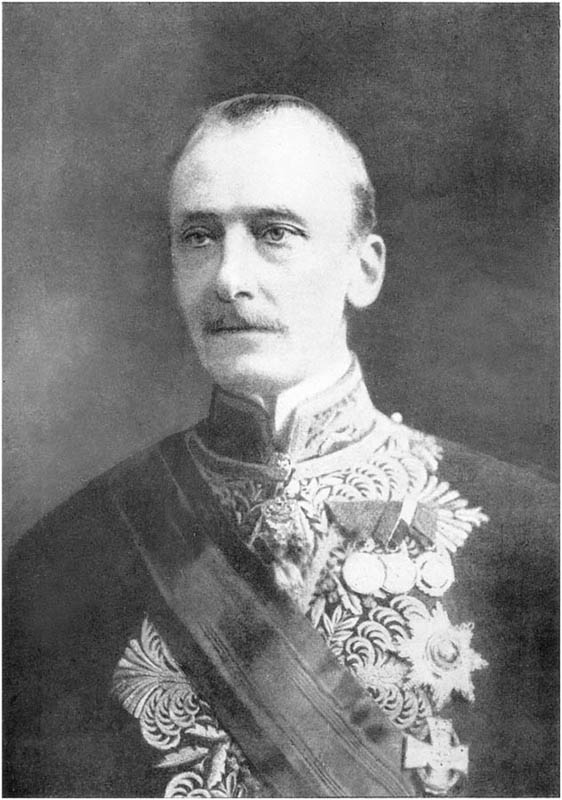
Ottokar Czernin represents Austria-Hungary.

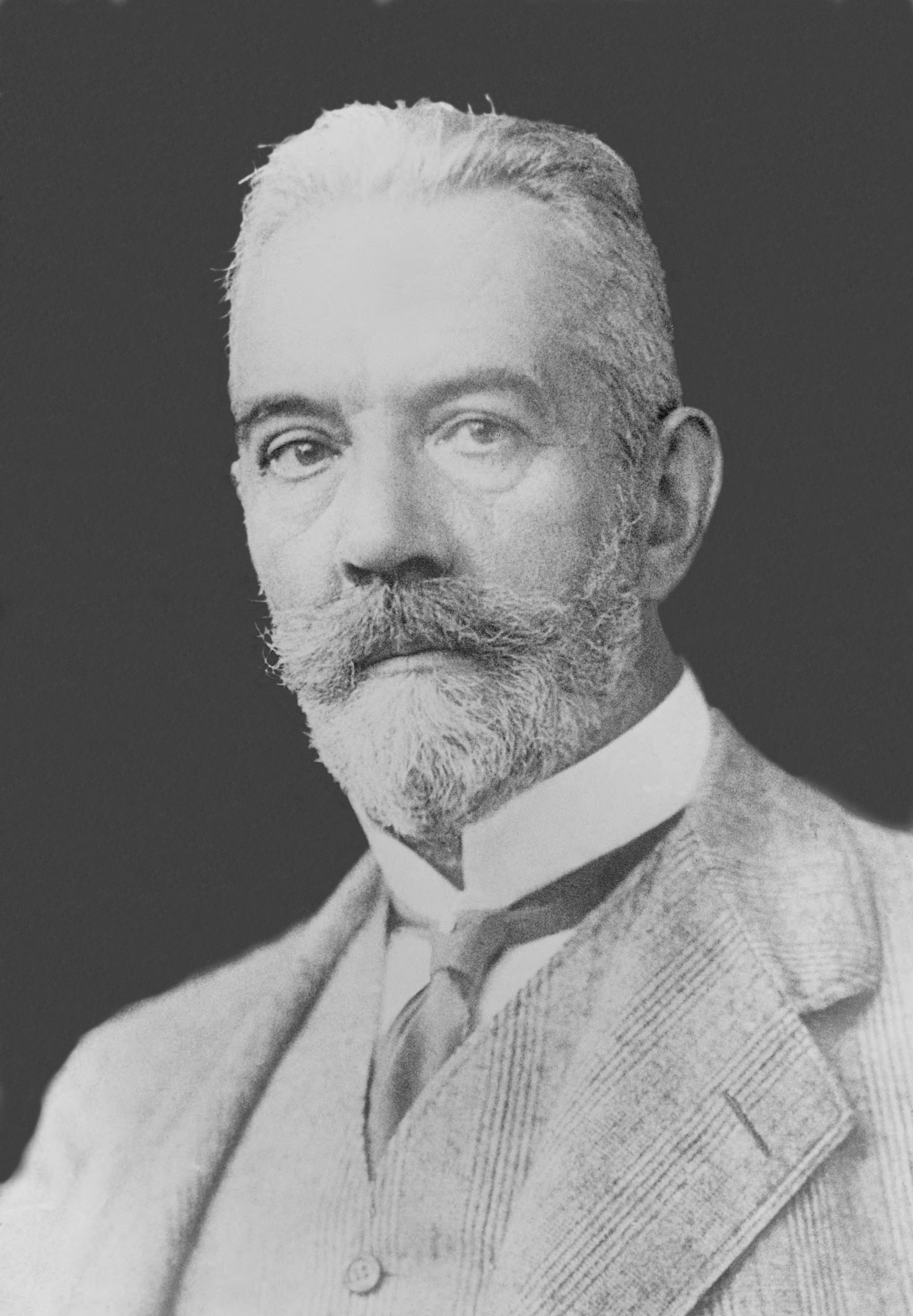
Chancellor Theobald von Bethmann Hollweg, shown here in 1917, imposed his conception of war aims on his Austro-Hungarian interlocutor.

The conference met at the Foreign Ministry headquarters in Berlin.

The meeting was chaired by German Chancellor Theobald von Bethmann Hollweg, assisted by State Secretary for Foreign Affairs Arthur Zimmermann; (Note: The German government consisted of the Chancellor, assisted by Secretaries of State.) the Chancellor and his State Secretary were advised by their principal collaborators.

Austro-Hungarian Foreign Minister Ottokar Czernin (Note: Ottokar Czernin, a close associate of Franz Ferdinand of Austria before his assassination, was appointed to the post by Charles I on 22 December 1916.) represented Austria-Hungary. His delegation included the Minister's new Chief of Cabinet, Alexander Hoyos, (Note: Alexander Hoyos, sent to Berlin during the July crisis, has held this post since January 24, 1917.) as well as Ladislas Müller von Szentgyörgyi, Head of Section in the Ministry of Foreign Affairs. (Note: Since the reforms of Joseph II, the Austrian Foreign Ministry has been organized into sections.)

== Discussions ==
=== Germany, key player in the Central Powers ===
In the exchanges between the German Chancellor and the Austro-Hungarian Minister, Theobald von Bethamnn Hollweg imposed German objectives on his Austro-Hungarian interlocutor, despite the appearance of an alliance between equal partners. The small number of real concessions obtained by the Austro-Hungarian minister was further proof of the increasingly asymmetrical nature of the alliance, putting Germany in a position to replace the Habsburg Empire, gradually ousting them from its political and economic positions in the Balkans and Eastern Europe.

However, at the beginning of 1917, the new Austro-Hungarian Foreign Minister tried once again to convince the German Chancellor of the need to compromise on the conditions for ending the conflict. Despite the fact that the balance of power within the alliance was largely in Germany's favor, the importance of its positions must be put into perspective. Czernin succeeded in negotiating a minimal framework for defining the war aims pursued by the two allies; this minimal program remained vague, however, allowing for wide-ranging interpretations on both sides.

=== Sharing conquests ===
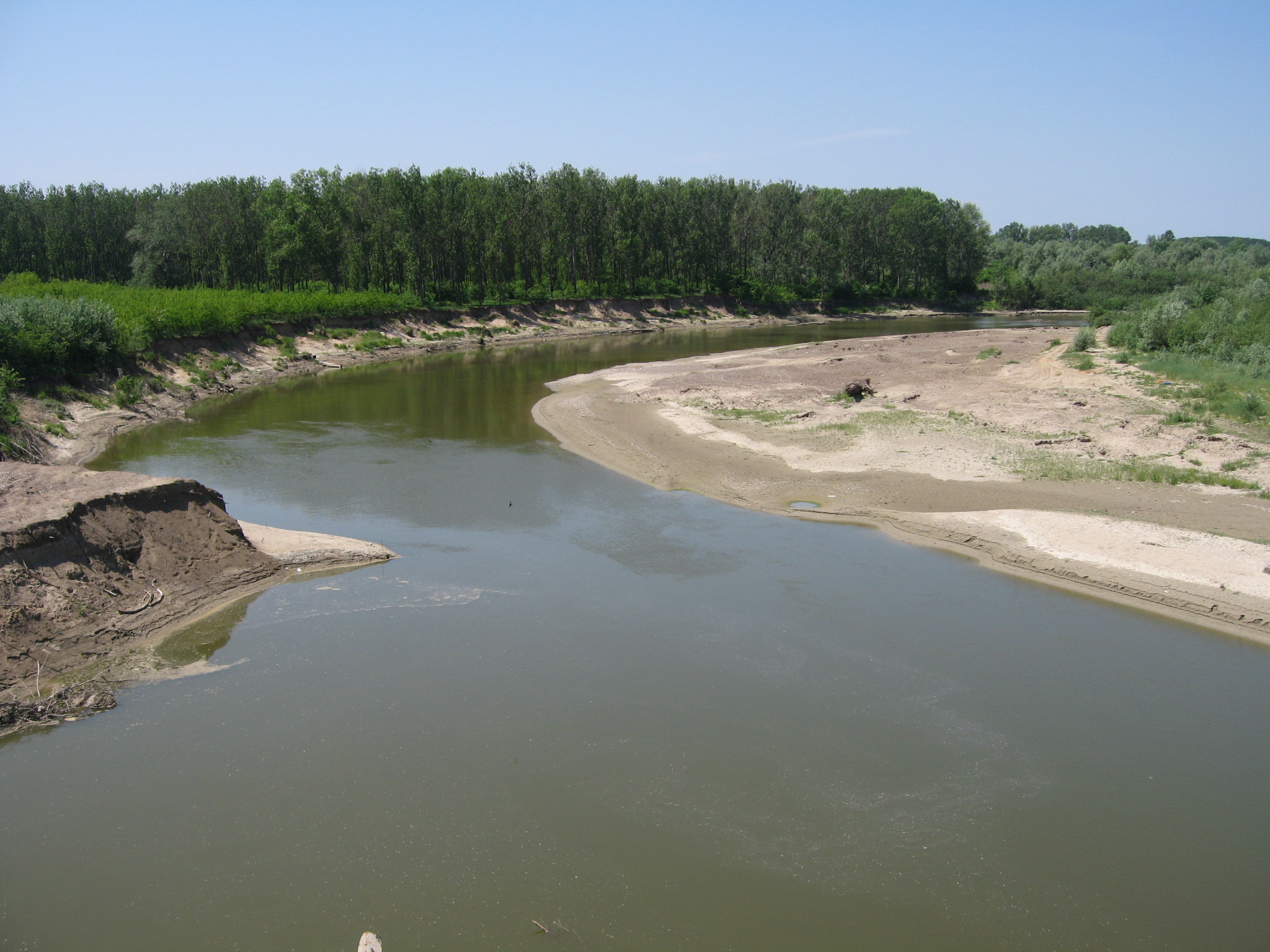
The Siret, here in the Mircesti region, is set to form the new border between Russian and Austrian zones of interest.

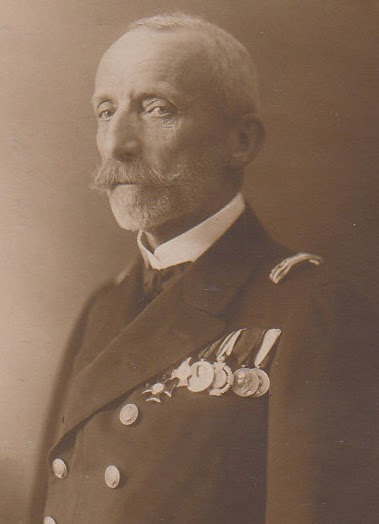
Czernin wanted to see the Polish royal crown vested in Charles Stephen of Austria, shown here in his uniform as admiral of the Austro-Hungarian war fleet in 1917.

The distribution of territories conquered by the Central Powers since the outbreak of hostilities was also an issue in the relationship between Germany and Austria-Hungary at the beginning of 1917.

Discussions quickly focused on the need for a balance to be established between the "respective military results achieved by the two powers" and the devolution of conquests to one or other of the empires; at the same time, Czernin was in favor of setting up a pool in order to delay as long as possible the question of the final devolution of conquests from Germany and its allies.

However, in the course of exchanges between the two parties, Czernin succeeded in convincing the Chancellor of the necessity of Romania's return to the Austro-Hungarian sphere of influence, in exchange for the ceded its interest in Poland to Germany: Romania territory was thus promised to be shared between Russia and Austria-Hungary, with the Siret marking the border between the Russian and Austro-Hungarian zones of influence. The status of the regions promised to Austria-Hungary had not yet been definitively determined, as the Austro-Hungarians vacillated between outright annexation or the establishment of a puppet monarchy, with the crown vested in an archduke of the Habsburg family.

=== Maintaining Germany's war aims ===
In a global context marked by the cessation of operations on the Eastern Front and the importance of German armies in the Austro-German alliance, (Note: From 1915 onwards, German and Austro-Hungarian divisions were nested in German-Austro-Hungarian armies, in which German units played a dominant role.) the German Chancellor claimed victory for Germany in this theater of operations. However, there was less and less certainty that Germany and its allies would be victorious in the prolonged conflict.

For this reason, the German representative opposed any "white peace" (i.e. without winners or losers) or any form of compromise with the Allies. On 11 March, fifteen days before the conference with Czernin, Bethmann Hollweg defined Germany's main war aims in front of his close advisors, aiming at becoming a true world power: the Chancellor proposed to bring Germany closer to its immediate neighbors, Belgium, Poland and the Habsburg monarchy.

=== Conflict exit conditions ===
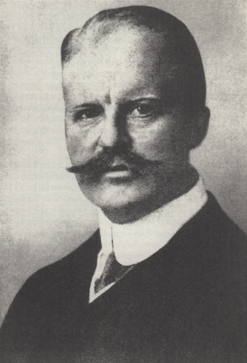
Arthur Zimmermann was in favor of opening peace negotiations with the Allies.

In a context marked by the weakening of military pressure on the Eastern Front, the Germans Bethmann-Hollweg and Zimmermann and the Austro-Hungarian Czernin defined the minimum conditions under which Germany and Austria-Hungary declared their readiness to leave the conflict.

In the eyes of the German ministers, the end of the conflict should, in the worst-case scenario, allow a return to the status quo ante bellum, including the restitution of the German colonial empire. (Note: The German colonial empire was now almost entirely under Allied control.) However, aware that the balance of power was increasingly in the Allies' favor, Bethmann-Hollweg tried to convince Germany's Oberste Heeresleitung, Paul von Hindenburg and Erich Ludendorff, who had asserted themselves in the spring and summer of 1917 as the true holders of political power, of the need to open compromise peace talks with the Allies. Disappointed, the latter considered forcing Wilhelm II, increasingly confined to a decorative role, to deposing the Chancellor.

For Austria-Hungary, its territorial integrity was, at the end of the winter of 1916–1917, the main goal of the war. For Czernin, the return of Eastern Galicia and Bukovina - still occupied by the Russian army - was a non-negotiable objective, even if it had to be paid for by abandoning Austro-Hungarian ambitions in Poland.

== Outcome ==
=== The 27 March protocol ===
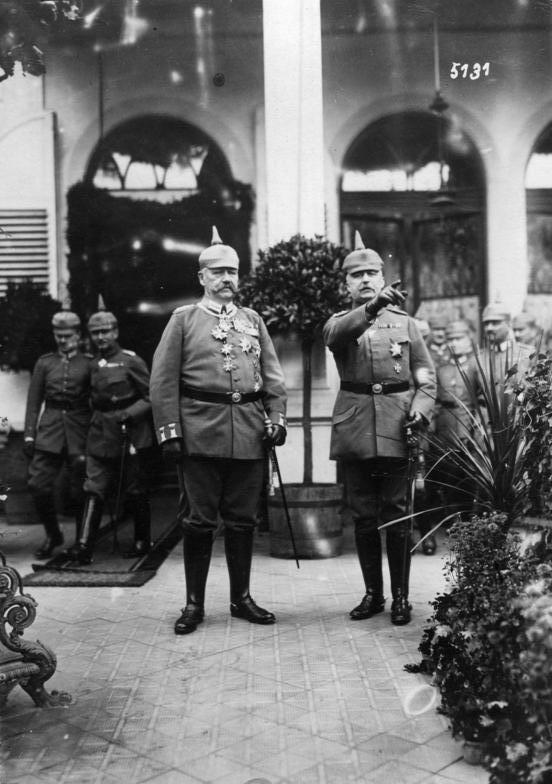
Paul von Hindenburg and Erich Ludendorff were not informed of the existence of the protocol of the March 1917 meetings.

The Berlin Conference of 26–27 March 1917 provided the opportunity to draw up a single set of minutes covering the partial advances negotiated on the Conference of Vienna (16 March 1917) as no minutes had been drawn up on 16 March.

The German Chancellor took part in the drafting of this protocol, but seems not to have informed either Paul von Hindenburg and Erich Ludendorff, nor the Secretary of State for Foreign Affairs, Arthur Zimmermann; similarly, Theobald von Bethmann Hollweg did not inform Georg Michaelis, his successor at the Chancellery, of the existence of this document.

This document defines the conditions for ending the conflict in a flexible way, and divides the European conquests of the Central Powers between the Germany, Austria-Hungary and Bulgaria; the means deployed by each of the three states in the quest for victory should constitute the key to dividing the conquests between the three allies, thus favoring the Germany and Austria-Hungary over Bulgaria.

=== German divergence ===
The results of the preparatory talks between the Germans and Austro-Hungarians gave rise to intense debate among German civil and military leaders; indeed, the extent of the concessions granted to Czernin by the German Chancellor and his key collaborators prompted the Hindenburg and Ludendorff to regard the German-Austro-Hungarian agreements of March as a "capitulation" by Germany Germany and Austria-Hungary. In their view, the agreement did not reflect the reality of the German war effort, and resulted in a shift in the balance of power in favor of Austria-Hungary, exhausted by shortages and human and material losses, while the greater part of the Central Powers's war effort fell on Germany and its economy, as the military were quick to point out.

This approach to the conflict and the redefinition of Germany's role prompted Hindenburg and Ludendorff and imperialist circles to demand that the Chancellor define a new program of war aims for Germany and its allies.

== See also ==
- Germany's Aims in the First World War
- Berlin Conference (November 2-6, 1917)
