= 5th Ersatz Division =

5th Ersatz Division (5. Ersatz-Division)
- Active: 1915-1919
- Country: Germany
- Branch: Army
- Type: Infantry
- Size: Approx. 12,500
- Engagements: World War I

Commanders
- Notable commanders: Gerhard Tappen

The 5th Ersatz Division (5. Ersatz-Division) was a unit of the German Army, in World War I. The division was formed in June 1915 as a temporary division known as the Division Basedow, named after its commander, Heino von Basedow. It was formed from two previously independent Brigades: 37th Mixed Landwehr and 2nd Reserve Ersatz. The division was converted into the 5th Ersatz Division in June 1916. The 5th Ersatz Division was disbanded in 1919, during the demobilization of the German Army after World War I.

== Combat chronicle ==
The division initially occupied defensive positions in the Yser region. In October 1916, it entered the Battle of the Somme. Thereafter, it occupied positions in the Champagne region until December 1916, when it was transferred to the Eastern Front. It fought in Lithuania until the armistice on the Eastern Front, and then carried out garrison duties in Estonia and Latvia until February 1919. Allied intelligence rated the division as fourth class, with only moderate fighting value.

== Order of battle on June 3, 1915 ==
The order of battle of the Division Basedow on June 3, 1915, was as follows:

- 2.Reserve-Ersatz-Brigade
  - Reserve-Ersatz-Infanterie-Regiment Nr. 3
  - Reserve-Ersatz-Infanterie-Regiment Nr. 4
- 37.Landwehr-Brigade
  - Landwehr-Infanterie-Regiment Nr. 73
  - Landwehr-Infanterie-Regiment Nr. 74
- 2.Landwehr-Eskadron/VIII. Armeekorps
- 2.Landwehr-Eskadron/X. Armeekorps
- 2.Landwehr-Eskadron/I. Bayerisches Armeekorps
- 2.Landsturm-Eskadron/II. Bayerisches Armeekorps
- Ersatz-Abteilung/2. Hannoversches Feldartillerie-Regiment Nr. 26
- 3.Kompanie/2. Westfälisches (Festungs-) Pionier-Bataillon Nr. 24
- 2.Landsturm-Pionier-Kompanie/IX. Armeekorps

== Order of battle on November 15, 1916 ==
The order of battle of the 5th Ersatz Division on November 15, 1916, was as follows:

- 37.Landwehr-Brigade
  - Landwehr-Infanterie-Regiment Nr. 73
  - Landwehr-Infanterie-Regiment Nr. 74
  - Reserve-Ersatz-Infanterie-Regiment Nr. 3
- 1.Eskadron/2. Hannoversches Dragoner-Regiment Nr. 16
- Feldartillerie-Abteilung Nr. 102
- 2.Landsturm-Pionier-Kompanie/IX. Armeekorps
- Minenwerfer-Kompanie Nr. 405

== Order of battle on January 1, 1918 ==
The 5th Ersatz Division's order of battle on January 1, 1918, was as follows:

- 37.Landwehr-Brigade
  - Landwehr-Infanterie-Regiment Nr. 73
  - Landwehr-Infanterie-Regiment Nr. 74
  - Landsturm-Infanterie-Regiment Nr. 8
- 1.Eskadron/2. Hannoversches Dragoner-Regiment Nr. 16
- Feldartillerie-Abteilung Nr. 102
- 2.Landsturm-Pionier-Kompanie/IX. Armeekorps
- Minenwerfer-Kompanie Nr. 405
- Divisions-Nachrichten-Kommandeur 6
