= Bulgarian Campaign =

Bulgarian Campaign may refer to:

- Byzantine–Bulgarian wars (680–1355)

- Bulgarian campaigns of Constantine VI (8th century)
- Bulgarian campaigns of Theodore II Laskaris (11th century)

- Bulgarian Campaign of World War I
- Bulgaria during World War II
