= Gerhard Tappen =

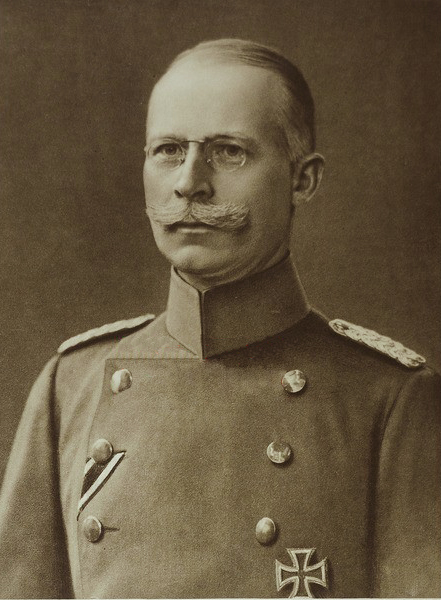
- Born: 3 July 1866; Esens, Kingdom of Hanover
- Died: 28 May 1953 (aged 86); Goslar, Lower Saxony, West Germany
- Military career
- Allegiance: German Empire
- Branch: Imperial German Army
- Service years: 1885–1919
- Rank: Generalleutnant; Char. General der Artillerie
- Units: Supreme Army Command; Army Group Mackensen
- Commands: 5th Ersatz Division; 15th Infantry Division
- Conflicts: World War I
- Awards: Pour le Mérite with oak leaves

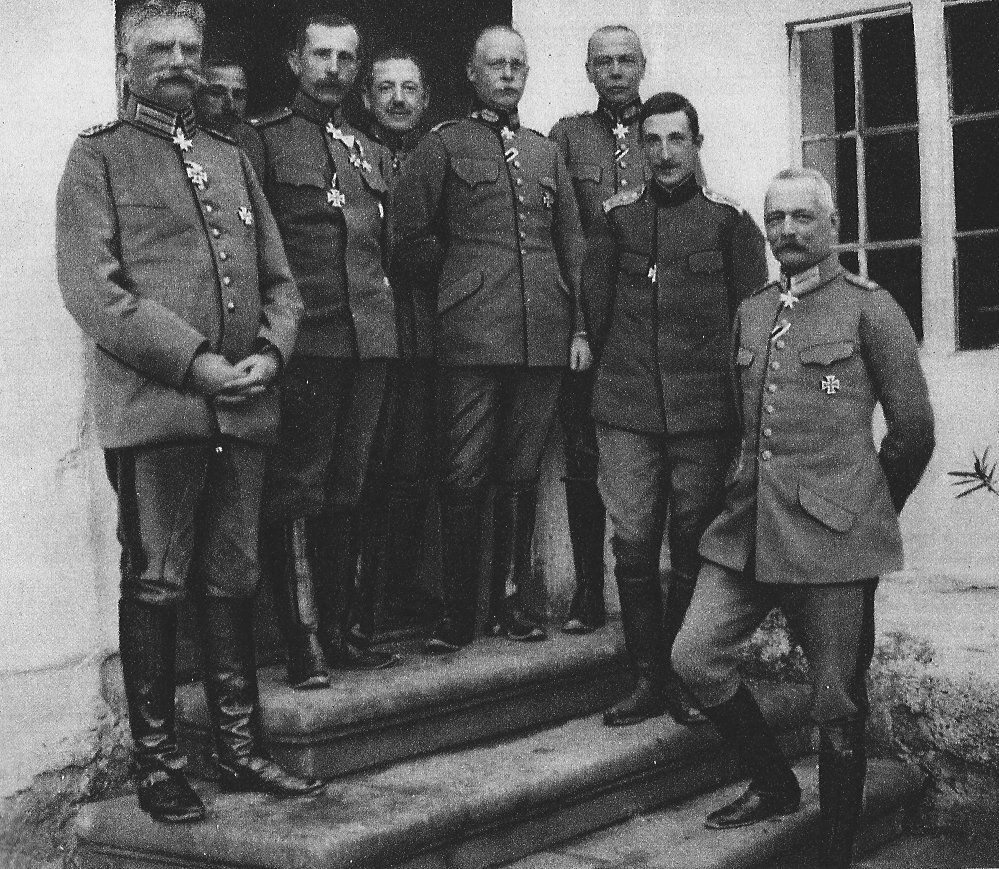
Tappen with German and Bulgarian commanders in Serbia 1915. From right to left: Erich von Falkenhayn, Boris of Bulgaria, Hans von Seeckt, Gerhard Tappen, Petar Ganchev, Nikola Zhekov and August von Mackensen

Dietrich Gerhard Emil Theodor Tappen (3 July 1866 – 28 May 1953) was a German World War I general.

Born in Esens, Tappen joined the Prussian Army in 1885 and became career officer with the artillery. At the start of the First World War, Tappen was a colonel in the Oberste Heeresleitung (OHL) in Koblenz, where he led the operations section which coordinated the German battle strategy. In September 1914 Tappen reported from a tour of inspection at the front that the French were too exhausted to begin an offensive, that a final push would be decisive and that more withdrawals would compromise the morale of the German troops, after the defeat on the Marne.

In March 1915 Tappen served as chief of staff of the 7th Army under Josias von Heeringen, but soon returned to OHL. On 26 June 1915 Tappen was promoted to major-general. He received the Pour le Mérite on 11 September 1915 and the Oak Leaves in January 1916. On 31 August 1916 Tappen was transferred out of OHL and became chief of staff to Army Group Mackensen on the Romanian front. In December 1916 Tappen became commander of the 5th Ersatz Division. From September 1917 until the Armistice Tappen commanded the 15th Infantry Division.

In 1920 Tappen wrote Bis zur Marne 1914: Beiträge zur Beurteilung der Kriegführung bis zum Abschluss der Marne-Schlacht.

Tappen died on 28 May 1953 in Goslar.
