= Identical note =

Term used in diplomacy

An identical note is a term used in diplomacy to denote terms agreed upon by two powers to coerce a third.

== See also ==
- Stimson Doctrine
