= Armistice between Russia and the Central Powers =

1917 de facto exit from World War I by Russia

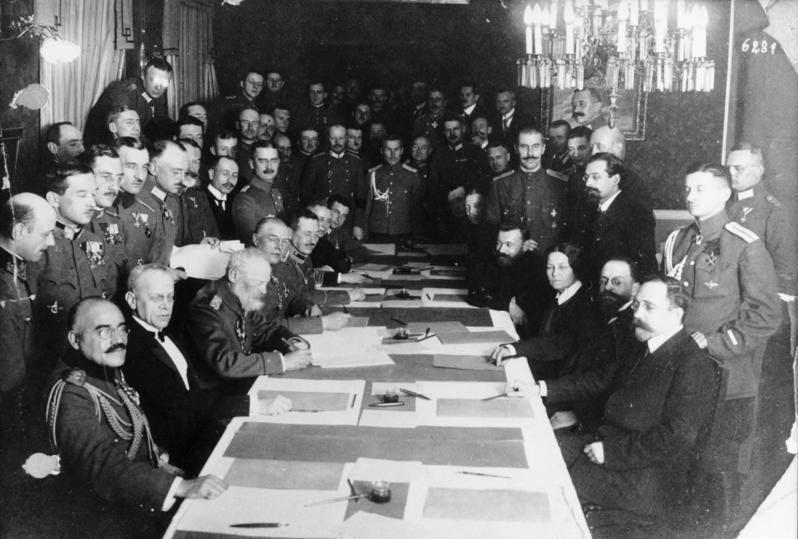
Signing of the armistice between Russia and the Central Powers on 15 December 1917

On 15 December [O.S. 2 December] 1917, an armistice was signed between the Russian Republic led by the Bolsheviks on the one side, and the Austro-Hungarian Empire, the Kingdom of Bulgaria, the German Empire and the Ottoman Empire—the Central Powers—on the other. The armistice took effect two days later, on 17 December [O.S. 4 December]. By this agreement, Russia de facto exited World War I, although fighting would briefly resume before the Treaty of Brest-Litovsk was signed on 3 March 1918, and Russia made peace.

== Ceasefires ==
The Bolsheviks came to power with the slogan "Bread and Peace". On 26 November [O.S. 13 November] 1917 three Russian emissaries under a white flag entered the German lines to arrange for negotiations which they agreed would be held at the headquarters of the Central Powers Armies at Brest-Litovsk. A local ceasefire agreement was reached at Soly on 4 December [O.S. 21 November] between the Russians and Germans on the Eastern Front (Russia's "Western Front"). It superseded any local ceasefires or truces already agreed to—without specifying what these were—and was to be in effect from 6–17 December. Notice of the agreement was published in Izvestia on 8 December [O.S. 25 November].

A fuller ceasefire encompassing all the Central Powers was signed at Brest-Litovsk on 5 December [O.S. 22 November], the day after the agreement with Germany at Soly. This ceasefire came into effect a day later 7 December [O.S. 24 November], but expired on the same date as the local agreement of 4 December. It was published in Izvestia on the day it came into effect. In Soviet historiography there is some dispute about whether any agreement was signed on 5 December, and the explicit reference in the text of the armistice to a ceasefire of that date is dismissed as an error. That the 5 December agreement is historical is generally agreed. One of the Russian negotiators, Lev Kamenev, wrote about the details of the agreement in Izvestia on 9 December [O.S. 26 November]; and the German General Max Hoffmann discussed it in his war diary.

== Armistice ==
The negotiations were organized by General Max Hoffmann, chief of staff of the Eastern Armies. His negotiating team consisted of five Germans, four Austro-Hungarians (led by Kajetan von Mérey), three Ottomans (led by Zeki Pasha) and two Bulgarians (led by Petar Ganchev). Russian overtures to their French, Italian, and British allies to join in were rejected with "an, angry stony silence". Foreign minister Leon Trotsky assembled a Russian delegation of 28, which one of them described as a menagerie because they were chosen to represent the social groups supporting the revolution, including soldiers, sailors, and factory workers. On the way to the railway station they realized that they lacked a peasant— one was recruited from the street. The female representative was celebrated for having assassinated a general. They were led by Adolph Joffe, an experienced Bolshevik who had studied medicine in Berlin, supported by a tsarist lieutenant colonel as military adviser and the experienced revolutionaries Kamenev and Lev Karakhan.

When they arrived at Brest-Litovsk they found the city a blackened ruin, burnt to the ground during the Russian retreat in 1915. The offices and common facilities of the headquarters were in the fortress which had survived the fire and lodgings were in temporary wooden buildings erected in its courtyards. The delegation was welcomed by Field Marshal Prince Leopold of Bavaria, a younger brother of the King of Bavaria and supreme commander on the eastern front. The Russians ate in the officer's mess, where their hosts endeavored to establish friendly relations with their perplexing guests.

After three days of negotiations they agreed on an armistice for 28 days, during which no German troops would leave the eastern front. The sticking point was that Joffe's instructions were to sign a general armistice for all of the fighting fronts, which Hoffmann rejected because obviously they had no such mandate from their allies. The talks were recessed for a week while Joffe obtained new instructions. The Russians returned without their symbolic soldier, sailor, worker, and peasant. On 15 December 1917, an armistice for 30 days was agreed, which would automatically be extended to 30 days until seven days after notice had been given by any party of its intention to resume hostilities. A supplement to the armistice was signed later the same day. It provided for a commission to be set up at Petrograd to restore the postal system, trade relations and the transport of books and newspapers. They also agreed to reconvene to begin to negotiate a peace treaty.

On 10 February 1918, the treaty negotiations broke down. On 17 February, Hoffmann gave official notice that hostilities would be renewed on 18 February, when the final campaign of the Eastern Front began, forcing the Russians to give way and sign.

== Bibliography ==
- Horne, Charles F. (1920). The Great Events of the Great War: A Comprehensive and Readable Source Record of the World's Great War. J.J. Little & Ives Company.
- Proceedings of the Brest-Litovsk Peace Conference: The Peace Negotiations Between Russia and the Central Powers 21 November, 1917 – 3 March, 1918. U.S. Government Printing Office. 1918. p. 36.
- Lincoln, W. B. (1986). Passage through Armageddon: The Russians in War and Revolution, 1914–1918. New York: Simon & Schuster.
- Slusser, Robert M.; Triska, Jan F. (1959). A Calendar of Soviet Treaties, 1917–1957. Hoover Institution on War, Revolution and Prace. Documentary series, no. 4. Stanford University Press.
- Thomas, Nigel (2012). The German Army in World War I (3): 1917–18. Osprey Publishing. ISBN 978-1-78096-575-8.
