= Petar Ganchev =

WWI Bulgarian military officer

Major General Petar Ganchev
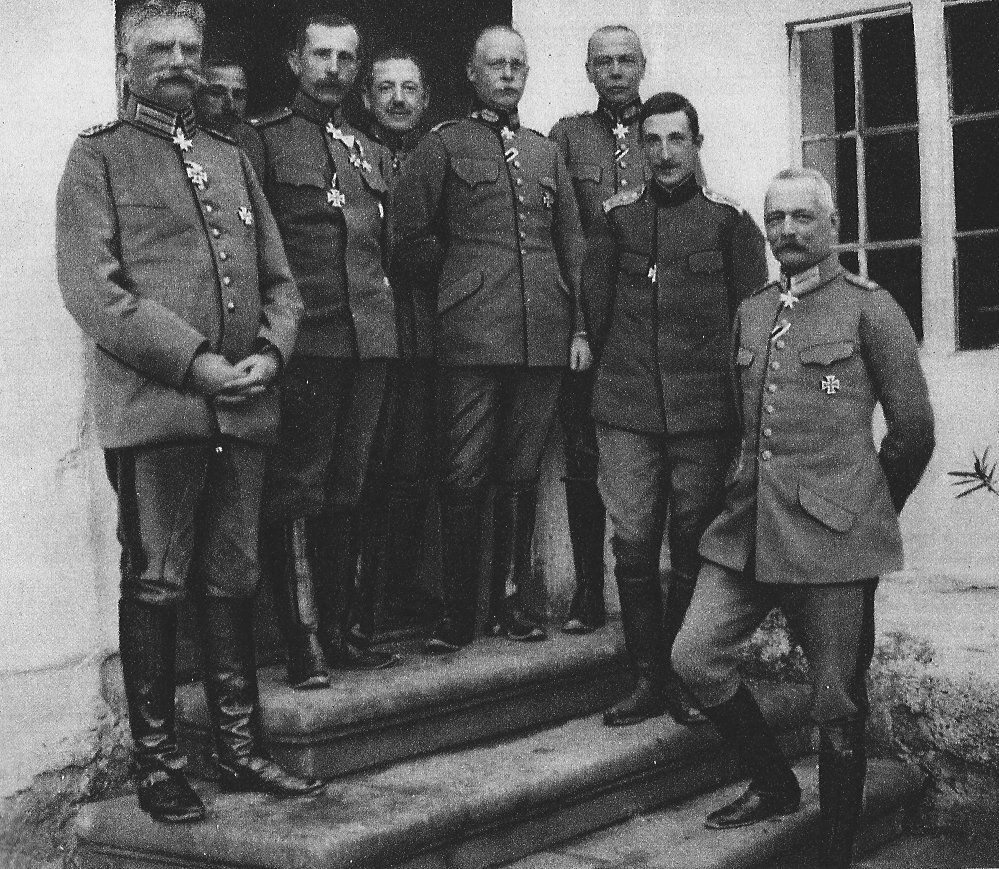
- Ganchev (fourth from left) with German military officers and Prince Boris of Bulgaria on 16 November 1915
- Native name: Петър Ганчев
- Born: 8 January 1874; Veliko Tarnovo, Ottoman Empire
- Died: 1950 (aged 75–76) Geneva, Switzerland
- Allegiance: Bulgaria
- Branch: Bulgarian Army
- Service years: 1893–1919
- Rank: Major general
- Conflicts: World War I; Macedonian front

Petar Ganchev (Note: Also spelt Gantchev, Gantcheff, or Gantscheff) (Bulgarian: Петър Ганчев; 8 January 1874 – 1950) was a Bulgarian military attaché. He helped negotiate Bulgaria's entry into World War I on the side of the Central Powers. He also attended the peace proceedings that resulted in the signing of the Treaty of Brest-Litovsk.

== Biography ==
Petar Ganchev was born on 8 January 1874 in Veliko Tarnovo, Ottoman Empire. He entered military service in the Bulgarian Army in 1893. Ganchev received part of his education in France and spoken fluent French.

Before World War I, Ganchev was a Bulgarian military attaché to Belgrade and Berlin. By 1915, Ganchev held the rank of colonel and the position of General of the General Staff and Delegate of the Royal Bulgarian Government.

On 3 August 1915, Ganchev traveled to the military headquarters of the German Empire on behalf of Bulgarian prime minister Vasil Radoslavov to negotiate Bulgaria's entry into World War I. He was authorized to sign an agreement joining Bulgaria to the Central Powers if terms were favorable. Ganchev demanded 200 million Swiss francs, German military support, and various territorial claims for Bulgaria; among his territorial demands he made to the German military included concessions from the Ottoman Empire, all of the region of Macedonia, all Serbian territory up to the Morava River, and — if Greece entered the war on the side of the Allied Powers — Kavala and Serres.

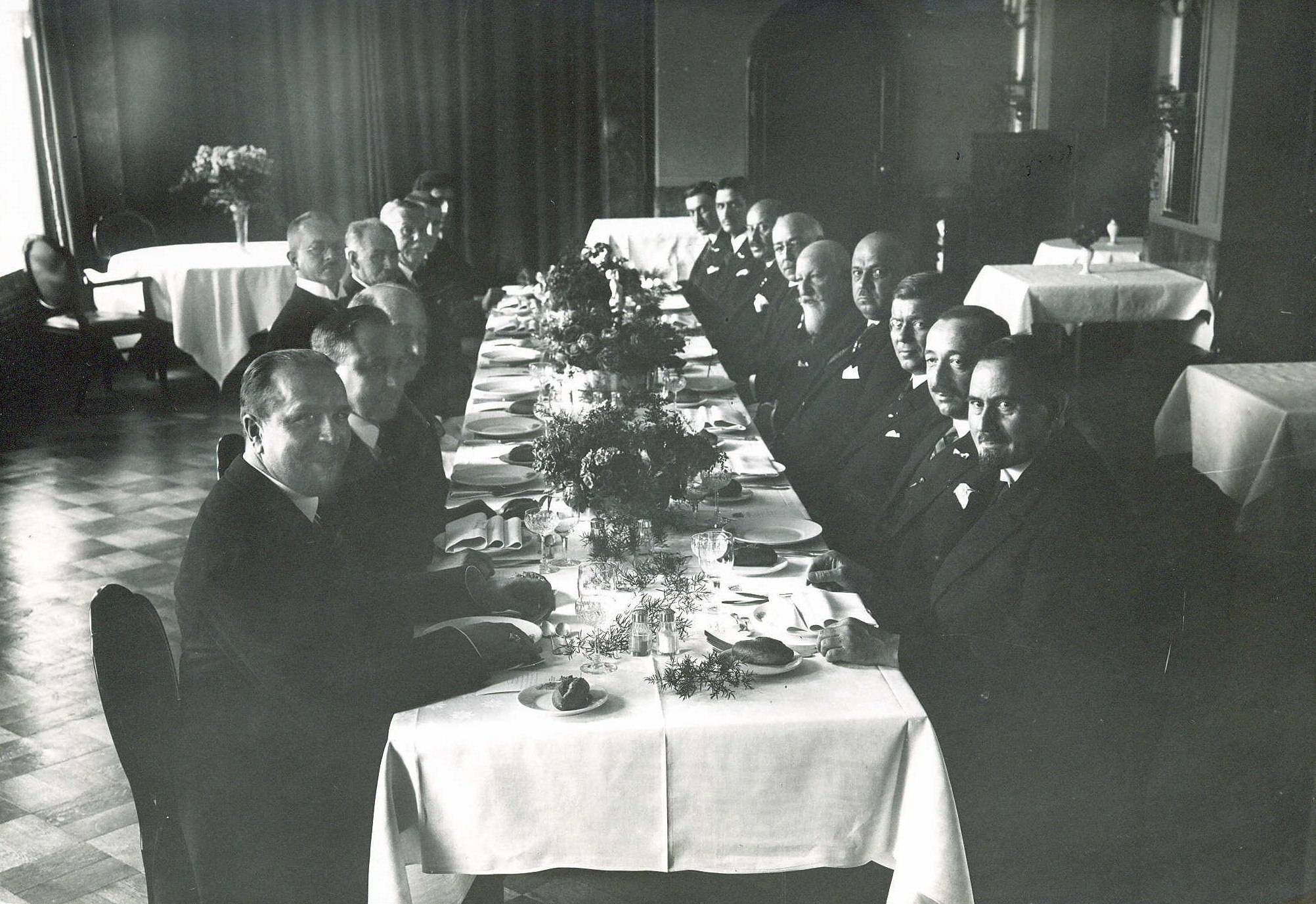
Ganchev (right, third from the top) with former tsar Ferdinand I and professors of Sofia University in 1929

On 6 September 1915, Ganchev, Erich von Falkenhayn, and Franz Conrad von Hötzendorf signed the Military Convention Between Germany, Austria-Hungary, and Bulgaria that accepted most of Bulgaria's demands as well as included a clause that Bulgaria would gain Dobruja if Romania joined the Allies. Bulgaria entered World War I on 11 October 1915 when it launched an invasion into Serbia.

From 1917 and 1918, Ganchev was one of two Bulgarian delegates that attended the proceedings that resulted in the signing of the Armistice between Russia and the Central Powers and the later Treaty of Brest-Litovsk. Ganchev presided over the 1 February 1918 plenary session of the peace negotiations.

Towards the end of World War I, Ganchev was the commander-in-chief of Bulgarian forces on the Macedonian front. Ganchev was one of the signatories of the Treaty of Neuilly-sur-Seine on 27 November 1919 that formally ended Bulgaria's participation in World War I.

By the time of Ganchev's retirement in 1919, he had obtained the rank of major general. Ganchev died in 1950 in Geneva, Switzerland.

== Awards and decorations ==
Ganchev received the following awards:

Austria-Hungary

- Order of Franz Joseph (knight)

Bavaria

- Military Merit Order (3rd class)

Bremen

- Hanseatic Cross

Bulgaria

- Order of Saint Alexander
- Order for Bravery
- Order of Military Merit
- Order for Merit
- Medal for Long Service in the Bulgarian Army
- 1912–1913 Commemorative Medal for War
- 1915–1918 Commemorative Medal for War
- 1908 Commemorative Medal for the Proclamation of Bulgarian Independence

Montenegro

- Order of Prince Danilo I (5th class)

Ottoman Empire

- Order of the Medjidie
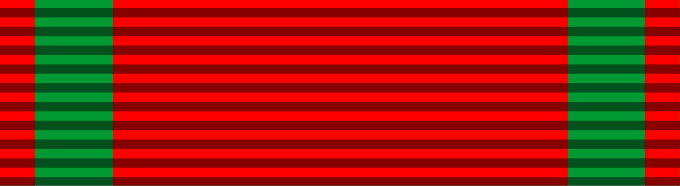
- Liakat Medal
- Gallipoli Star

Prussia

- Order of the Red Eagle
- Order of the Crown
- Iron Cross (1st class)

Russia

- Order of Saint Anna
- Order of Saint Stanislaus (2nd class)
- Medal for Diligence

Saxe-Meiningen

- Saxe-Ernestine House Order

Saxony

- Albert Order

Serbia

- Order of the White Eagle (3rd class)
- Order of the Cross of Takovo
- Order of St. Sava

Württemberg

- Order of the Crown
- Friedrich Order
