= Spa Conference =

Spa Conference may refer to:

- Spa Conference (12 May 1918), the first of four wartime conferences held in Spa by the German Empire during World War I
- Spa Conference (2-3 July 1918), held during the planning and execution of the Spring offensive
- Spa Conference (13–15 August 1918), which recognized the improbability of victory
- Spa Conference (29 September 1918), the final wartime meeting in Spa
- Spa Conference of 1920, a postwar meeting between Weimar Germany and the Allies
