= Spa Conference of 1920 =

Negotiations about German reparations

Coordinates: 50°29′47″N 5°53′14″E

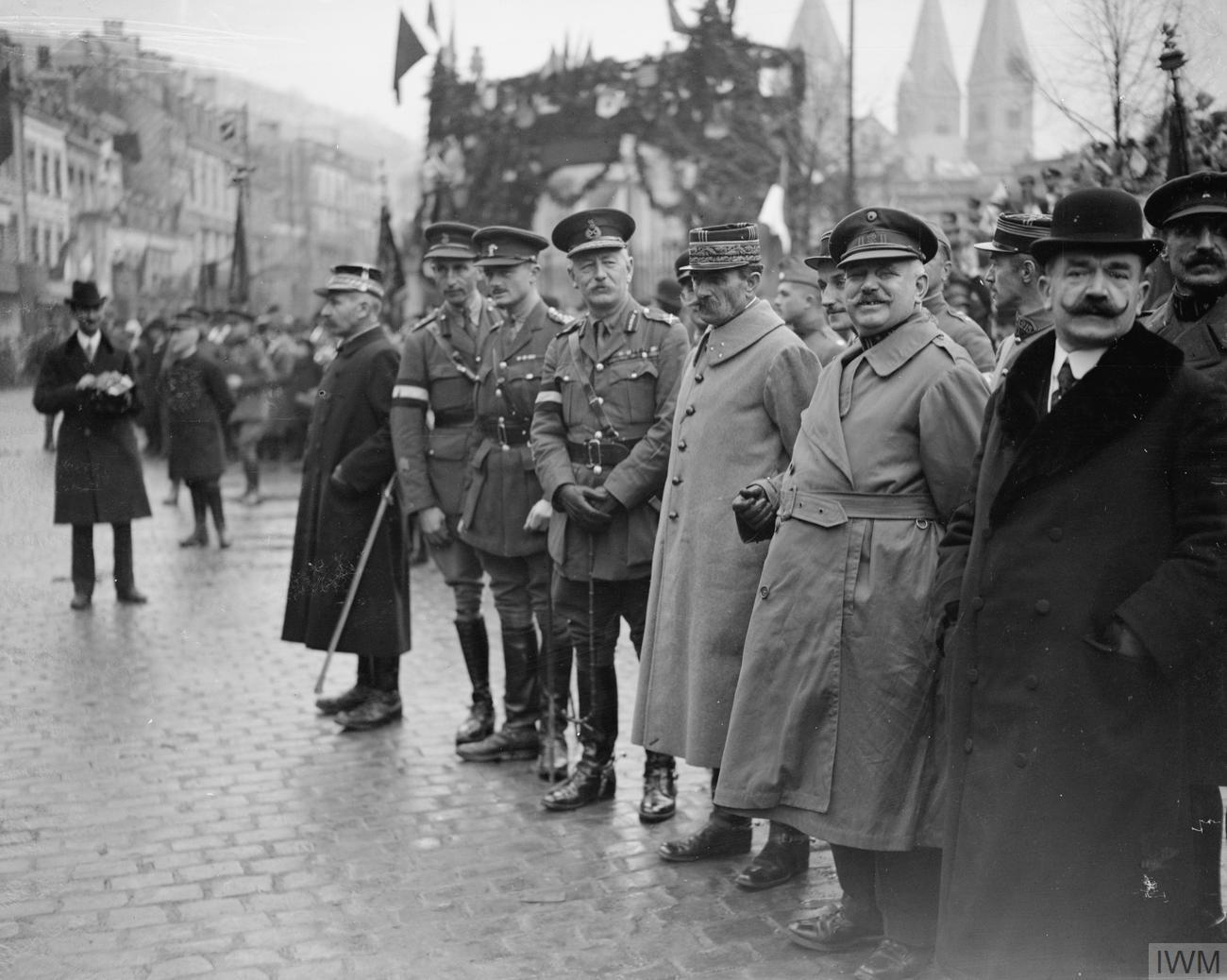
The Armistice Commission in Spa. Lieutenant General Richard Haking (British), General Alphonse Nudant (President and French representative), and General Hector Delobbe.

The Spa Conference was a meeting between the Supreme War Council and the government of the Weimar Republic in Spa, Belgium on 5–16 July 1920. The main topics were German disarmament, coal shipments to the Allies and war reparations.

== Attendees ==
The Spa Conference was the first post-war conference to include German representatives. The Allies considered that if there were violations of the peace treaty and issues concerning reparations, it would be better to discuss the problems face-to-face than through an exchange of notes. The conference was attended by heads of state, heads of government and foreign secretaries. The attendees included British and French Prime Ministers David Lloyd George and Alexandre Millerand, and German Chancellor Constantin Fehrenbach. The British and French ambassadors to Germany, Lord d'Abernon and Charles François Laurent, were invited to the Conference and tasked with supervision of reparation payments and control of the Berlin-based Reparation Commission.

== Discussions ==
=== Coal shipments ===
Contrary to German expectations, the conference did not focus on the issue of war reparations but was initially dominated by the topic of disarmament, also part of the Treaty of Versailles. Due to current events, the coal negotiations then moved to centre stage.

The issue of coal pertained to shipments from Germany to France, Belgium and Italy according to Art. 236 of Part VIII of the Versailles Treaty. In a protocol signed on 19 August 1919, Germany had agreed on these deliveries, but due to the uprisings of spring 1920 (Kapp Putsch, Ruhr uprising) and associated strikes in the coal industry, it had been unable to comply.

Discussion of the coal issue, which began on 9 July, soon showed that the Allies were unwilling to compromise. At the very beginning, threats about sanctions were issued, with Millerand acting as the spokesman on the Allied side. After days of tough negotiations, the talks almost broke down on 14 July. On 16 July, Fehrenbach and Foreign Minister Walter Simons signed the Spa coal protocol as drawn up by the Allies. Germany promised to deliver 2 million tons of coal per month for six months. In exchange for the Allied right to insist on the delivery of specific types or quality of coal, Germany was granted 5 gold marks per ton to purchase food for the miners. In addition, the Allies agreed to monthly advance payments for the coal. The German side did not sign up to the Allied threat that missed deliveries would be answered by military occupation of the Ruhr or other German territories.

Despite Allied financial concessions, the coal agreement dealt a heavy blow to the German economy. Supply of coal had been adequate before the conference, but now domestic bottlenecks emerged that damaged output of the iron and steel industry, the railways and coal conversion industry.

=== War reparations ===
The German foreign minister, Walter Simons, only got a chance on the afternoon of 10 July to outline the German position on reparations. He mostly followed a proposal endorsed by the cabinet beforehand, and avoided naming any hard numbers or dates. On 12 July, the German delegation handed over a number of proposals, once again without definite sums, calling for a total of 30 annual payments. On 13 July these proposals were discussed by a sub-committee of the conference, but the concurrent coal discussions had escalated to such a degree that debate on this issue was stopped. The topic was only revisited a few weeks later at a conference in Geneva.

There was no settlement of the total sum of German reparations, but the shares of the recipients were fixed: France 52%, UK 22%, Italy 10%, Belgium 8% with the remainder (8%) distributed among the other Allied nations.

=== Disarmament ===
The discussions of disarmament focused on the strength of the German army and the treatment of the Sicherheitspolizei, paramilitary police units. The German side arrived with the negotiation goal of a 200,000-man army and the intent to keep the police units, while possibly making concessions on their equipment. However, on this issue also the Allied side was unwilling to move. By the second day the Allies threatened to break off the talks and to implement sanctions unless the German delegation abandoned the 200,000-man target. The German counterproposal agreed to 100,000 men but asked for a longer period of implementation. This was rejected by the Allies, and on 8 July they handed over a note that specified their position and demanded its signature by the Germans by the next day.

Fehrenbach contacted Berlin, and on the morning of 9 July his cabinet agreed but instructed the delegation not to sign the sanction threat the protocol contained.

The protocol signed by Fehrenbach and Simons on 9 July called for Sicherheitspolizei and militias to be disarmed immediately and for laws to be passed to disarm the general population. The regular German army was scheduled to be reduced to 100,000 men by 1 January 1921 (this was less than six months away, but later than initially demanded by the Allies), conscription was to be abolished and replaced by a professional army and substantial materiel was to be handed over to the Allies. This was backed up by an Allied threat to occupy additional German territory in case of violations. However, the German side introduced a proviso clause stating that they did not accede to this last point.

=== Other topics ===
Other controversial issues included the trial of German war criminals and the status of Gdańsk.

There was also discussion of the territorial dispute over Cieszyn Silesia between the Second Polish Republic and Czechoslovakia. After the conference, on 28 July 1920, the territory was divided between the states leaving Trans-Olza with a sizable Polish minority on the Czech side of the border. This division also created further future animosities between these two countries.

== See also ==
- Curzon Line
- Spa Conferences (First World War)
- Spa Conference (2-3 July 1918)
- Spa Conference (29 September 1918)

== Sources ==
- Shuster, Richard J. (2006), German disarmament after World War I: the diplomacy of international arms inspection, 1920-1931, Cass series / Strategy and history, vol. 14, Psychology Press, ISBN 978-0-415-35808-8
- Steller, Verena (2016), "Diplomacy between Versailles and Locarno", The Transformation of Foreign Policy: Drawing and Managing Boundaries from Antiquity to the Present, Oxford University Press, ISBN 978-0-19-878386-2
- Zahradnik, Stanisław; Ryczkowski, Marek (1992), Korzenie Zaolzia (in Polish), Warsaw, Prague, Třinec: PAI-press, OCLC 177389723
