= Spa Conference (29 September 1918) =

The Spa conference of September 29, 1918 is the last important conference between the main political and military leaders of the German Empire, (Note: Between 1871 and 1945, the official name of the German state was Deutsches Reich.) then engaged in the First World War. Held in the last weeks of the conflict, it is intended to draw the political and military conclusions of the Bulgarian defection. Indeed, after the failures encountered by the central powers in Italy and on the Western Front, the leaders of the Reich can only acknowledge the strategic impasse in which they have found themselves since the month of August 1918. The Allied successes against the Bulgarians, followed by the withdrawal of Bulgaria and the rapid Allied rise towards the Danube, forced those responsible for the Central Powers, mainly Germans, to draw the consequences of their failures. However, kept in ignorance of the reality of the military situation, the members of the Reich government initially remained incredulous in the face of the military's declarations. During the month of September, the latter are urging the government to begin talks with a view to suspending the conflict. The conference constitutes the opportunity to announce this desire for policy change. The conference brought together in Spa, then the headquarters of the Oberste Heeresleitung (OHL, Supreme Command of the Army), the main military leaders of the Reich, the chancellor and his vice-chancellor around Kaiser Wilhelm II. All agreed on the need to request an armistice to limit the demands of the Allies, as well as on political reforms to be implemented to democratize the Reich, which was then to be transformed into a parliamentary monarchy.

== Context ==
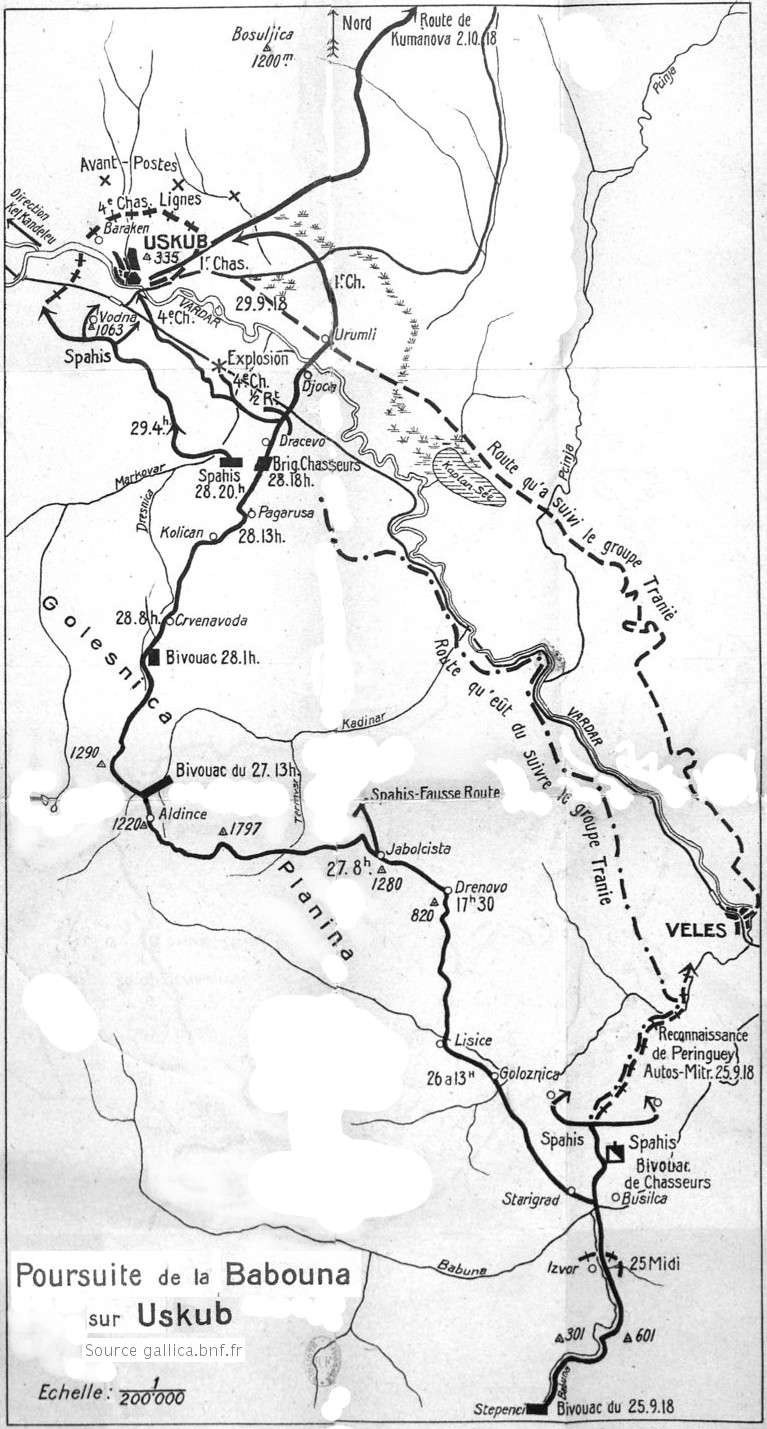
The Uskub manoeuvre tore open the Bulgarian front, forced Bulgaria to request an armistice and enabled the rapid reconquest of Serbia, rapidly threatening the Austro-Hungarian borders and severing the lines of communication between the Reich and its Ottoman ally.

=== The Bulgarian defection ===
Following the defeat at Doiran, the Macedonian front, held mainly by the Bulgarians, collapsed in the face of Franco-Serb units engaged in a rapid ascent towards the North through Serbia towards Belgrade, an offensive that the Central Powers were unable to effectively hinder.

Quickly, the efficiency of the Allied exploitation of the breakthrough achieved on September 15 forced Bulgaria, exhausted by three years of war, to request an armistice on September 25, by sending a delegation to negotiate its clauses. The armistice negotiations between the Bulgarians and the Allies were concluded quickly, between September 26 and 28, prompting Ludendorff to order energetic measures, however all doomed to failure.

Faced with this situation in the Balkans, the German High Command attempted to enact countermeasures intended, if not to keep Bulgaria in the conflict, at least to stop the rise of Franco-Serb troops towards the Danube: some advocated Austro-German troop operations in Bulgaria, Ludendorff proposed closely controlling King Ferdinand, or even removing him, in order to force Ferdinand to keep his country in the German alliance.

=== The political and military situation of the Central Powers ===
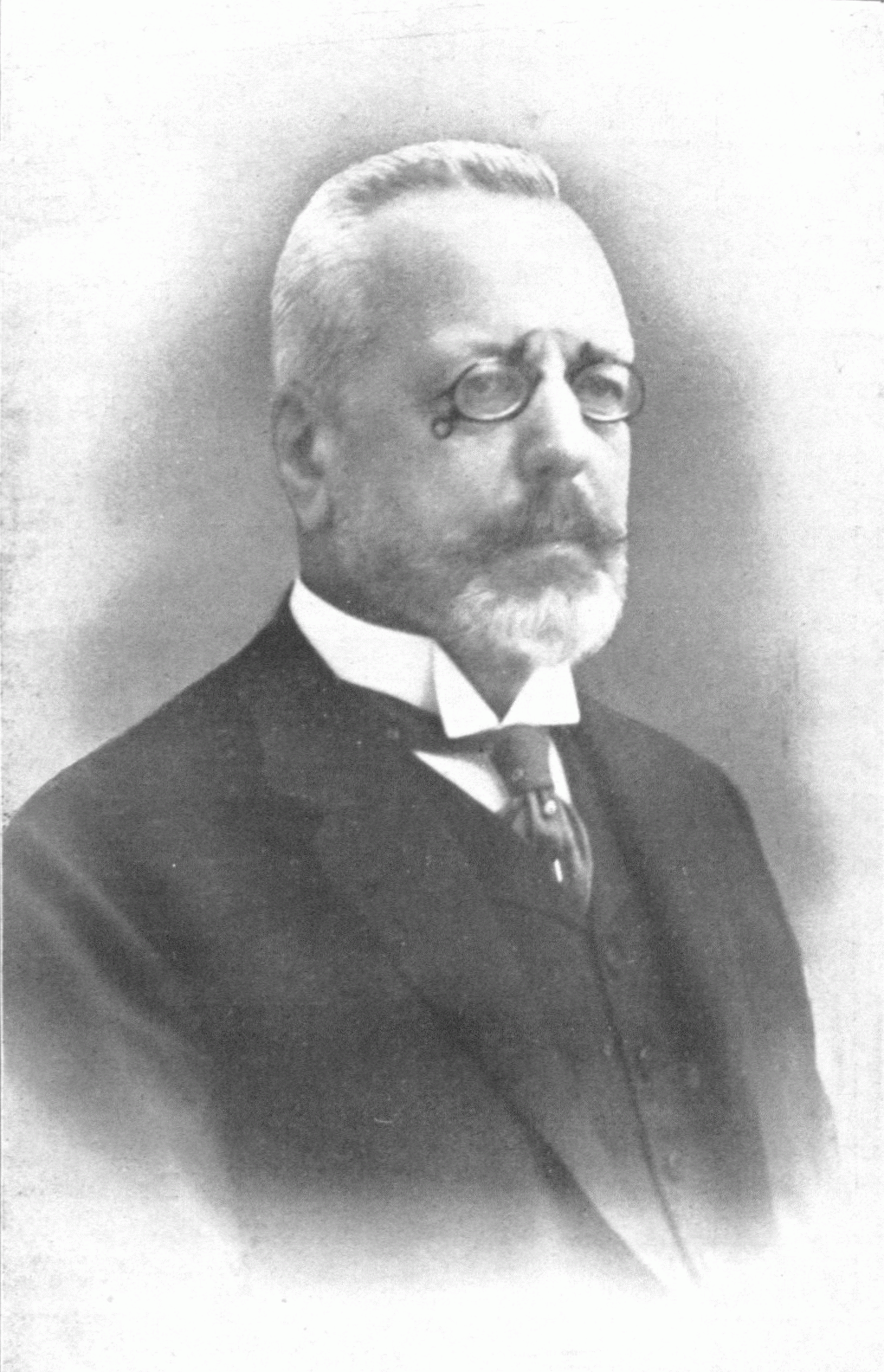
Stephan Burián von Rajecz, then foreign minister of the dual monarchy, tried to bring his country out of the conflict.

Since the month of August, the Central Powers are increasing initiatives in order to end the conflict.

However, in the face of looming defeat, some Reich political leaders seemed blind to the country's situation. So, at the beginning of the month of September 1918, Wilhelm II, influenced by his chief of staff, Friedrich Wilhelm von Berg, an extremist conservative, gave his interlocutors the image of a head of state who was generally ill-informed about the reality of the situation of the Reich and its allies.

Moreover, for months, Austro-Hungarian diplomats have been trying to carry out parallel diplomacy, until then without any tangible result other than strengthening the links between the dual monarchy and the Reich, subjecting Austria-Hungary to Reich; (Note: At the Spa Conference the previous May, German officials had imposed on Emperor Charles a political alliance, a military convention and a commercial treaty, officially placing the two allies on an equal footing. In fact, Austria-Hungary, exhausted by nearly four years of war, had to accept German tutelage.) However, Austro-Hungarian officials managed, between spring and summer, to limit the economic consequences of this subjection. Thus, the Germans are trying to convince these officials to participate in a common initiative during the first days of the month of September: September 14, despite multiple German pressures, Stephan Burian, then Austro-Hungarian Minister of Foreign Affairs, published a note proposing the opening, in a neutral country, of peace negotiations between the dual monarchy and the Allies. Faced with this proposal, the Allies, perfectly informed of the seriousness of the internal situation of Austria-Hungary, rejected the Austro-Hungarian proposal without discussion. This demoralization of those responsible for the dual monarchy also finds its counterpart in the Reich. Indeed, the population appeared nervous, and the German imperial army was then undermined by desertions and manifestations of insubordination. This army, exhausted, retreated under the increasingly marked blows of the Allies; at the same time, to amplify the successes of August and September 1918, the Allied military leaders then planned an offensive intended to deprive the Germans of any possibility of action on the front.

From a military point of view, Ludendorff, with no illusions about the situation of the imperial army, tried to deal with the most urgent matter, the reconstitution of a front in the Balkans. Thus, the latter has already dispatched an army there, supposed to concentrate in the Niš region; however, realizing the insufficiency of these means, he considered deploying the divisions occupying Ukraine. (Note: This solution would, however, deprive the central powers of access to the agricultural wealth of this country, then occupied by the Reich and the dual monarchy.) Made up of seven German and Austro-Hungarian units and placed under the responsibility of Austro-Hungarian Marshal Hermann Kövess, based in Niš, this new army received the mission of stopping the Allied troops in central Serbia in their ascent towards the North, without success. Indeed, the units that make up this army constitute a disparate force and lack cohesion; moreover, their concentration in the Niš region was quickly called into question by the speed of the advance of the Allied units, engaged in a vast war of movement. Parallel to this rapid rise of Allied troops in the Balkan Peninsula, since September 26, a vast Allied offensive is launched in France, coordinated by Ferdinand Foch. As the days passed, the Allied units pushed back the German troops along the entire length of the front, this offensive no longer being able to be stopped by units placed in reserve, then in insufficient numbers. (Note: On October 5, 1918, the German army only had twenty-two divisions placed in the general reserve.)

== The last major OHL conference ==
=== Participants ===
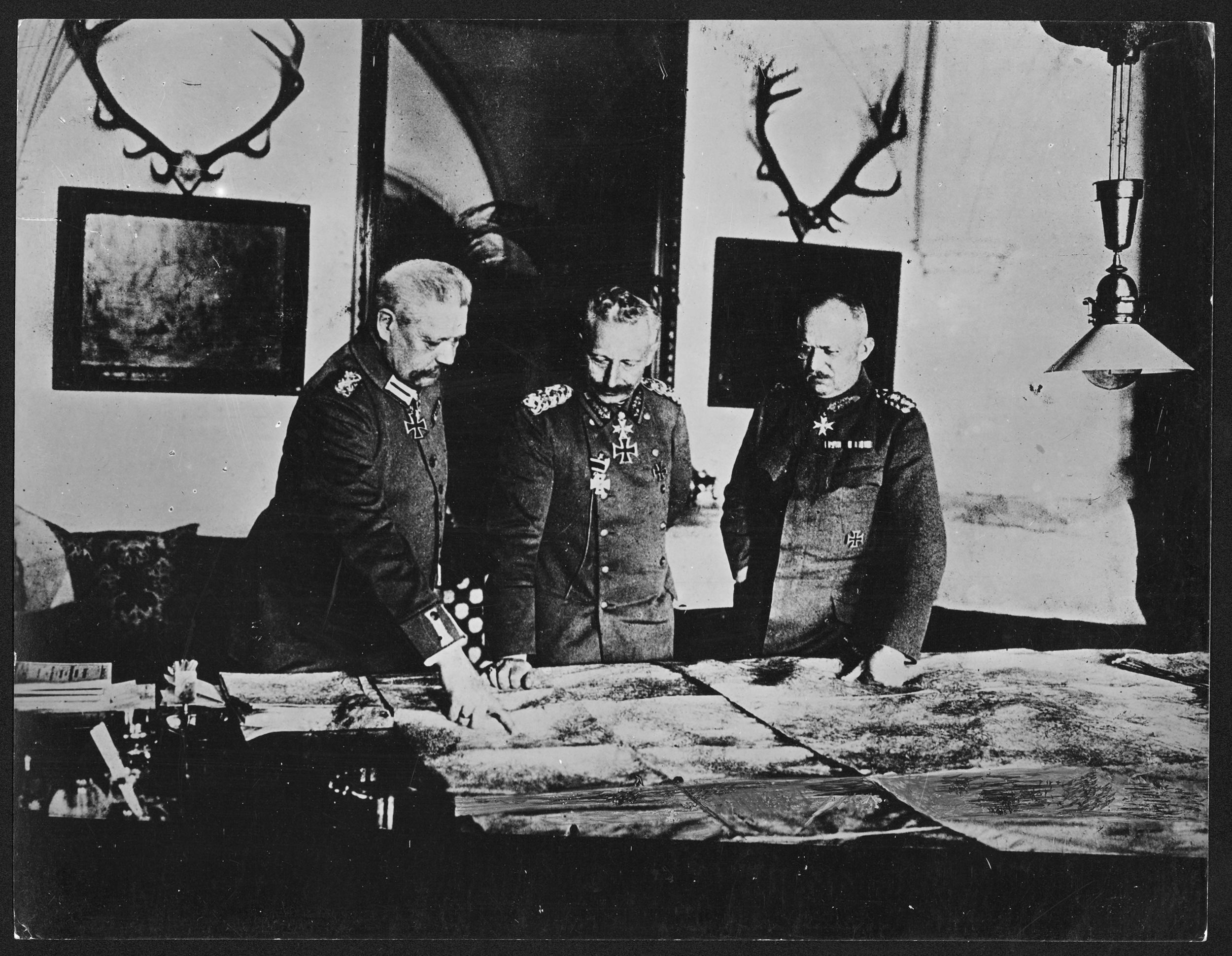
From left to right, Paul von Hindenburg, Wilhelm II and Erich Ludendorff in Spa in 1918.

While Erich Ludendorff suffered from a nervous breakdown, (Note: Without his knowledge, a neurologist examined him, at the request of his close collaborators.) his new deputy, Heye, having become aware of the seriousness of the situation, pressed the Reich Minister of War, as well as Vice-Chancellor Paul von Hintze, to go to the headquarters of the Oberste Heeresleitung, the supreme command of the German army, in Spa.

Thus, on Sunday September 29, at ten o'clock in the morning, Paul von Hindenburg, Erich Ludendorff, Paul von Hintze, were present at this conference; they were to appear before Wilhelm II, joined by the chancellor, Georg von Hertling, at the beginning of the afternoon.

=== Issues ===
Faced with a military situation which becomes more and more precarious as the days go by, in particular due to mass desertions, the participants in the conference propose an exit from the conflict to avoid taking responsibility for the defeat of the Reich and to mollify the allied representatives, in order to obtain more lenient conditions.

In this perspective, Ludendorff suggests requesting an armistice in order to avoid the occupation of the territory of the Reich by the Allies.

Furthermore, in an attempt to soften Allied demands, the participants attempted to initiate, before the cessation of hostilities, the democratization of the German Empire, hoping to negotiate a more favorable peace and safeguard the rights of the imperial dynasty.

== Decisions ==
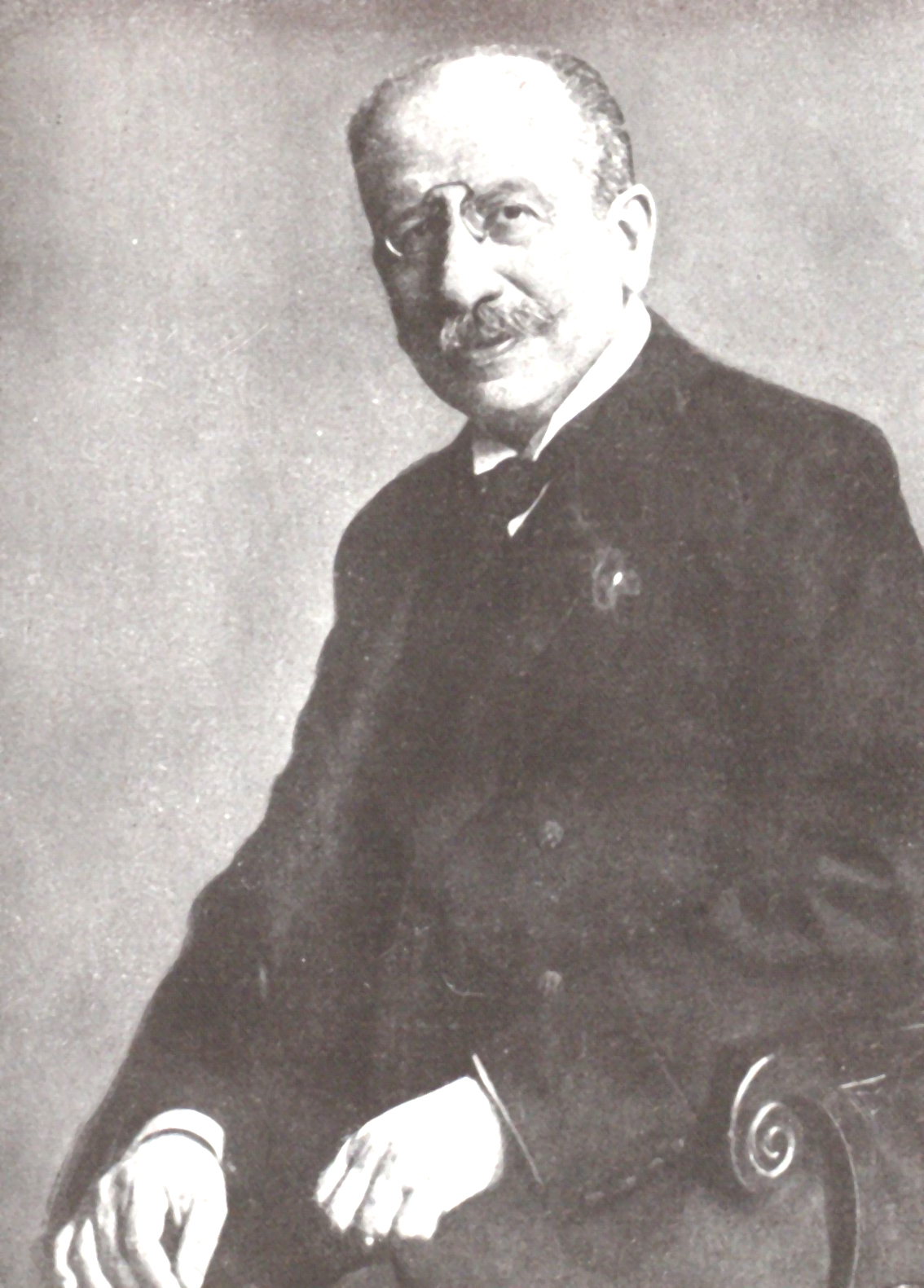
Albert Ballin is an actor in the decisions taken on September 29.

This conference did not give rise to real debates between the main leaders of the Reich; in fact, military officials are requesting the opening of negotiations with a view to a cessation of hostilities, supported by the vice-chancellor.

=== Maintaining the war aims of the Reich in September 1918 ===
Responsible for the management of the war, the participants in this conference outline a renovation of the war aims program. They are in favor of opening negotiations guaranteeing the Reich the benefits of the treaties signed with Russia, in Brest-Litovsk or in Berlin, and with Romania in Bucharest.

Emperor Wilhelm supports the proposal to camouflage the maintenance of war aims in Eastern Europe behind anti-Bolshevik propaganda: the Reich would then assert itself as the protector of the new states bordering Bolshevik Russia. In September, the Reich multiplied agreements with the dual monarchy regarding Poland, as well as with the representatives of Ukraine, then independent, while, simultaneously, the political, economic and military actors of the Reich at war worked to several texts intended to establish the terms of its return to the international concert, aiming in particular at the lifting of discriminatory clauses in commercial matters, in force since the outbreak of the conflict.

=== Armistice request ===
On the day of the conference, Hindenburg and Ludendorff, the dioscuri, (Note: These two soldiers, architects of the German conduct of the war, are sometimes referred to by this term.) demanded from Hintze, then in charge of foreign affairs, the rapid opening of negotiations with a view to the conclusion of an armistice: in fact, they assured the latter that the Reich finds it impossible to continue the war.

Supported by representatives of heavy industry in favor of direct talks between the Reich and the United States, notably Albert Ballin, these same political and military leaders attempted to negotiate an exit from the conflict as least unfavorable as possible to the interests of the Reich, in opening direct talks with this country which then asserts itself as the arbiter of the conflict.

Furthermore, in order to make the German population, accustomed to victory announcements, accept defeat, military leaders proposed political reforms in the Reich, rejecting proposals aimed at establishing a military dictatorship.

=== Democratization of the empire ===
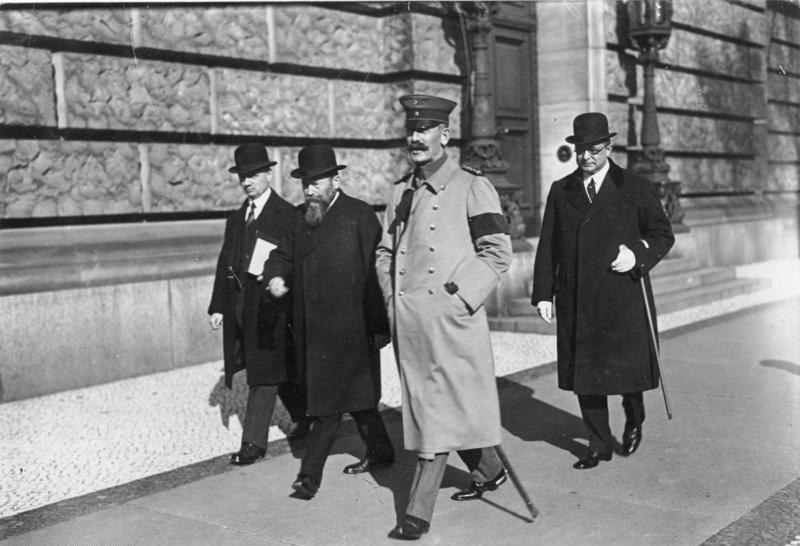
Chancellor Max of Baden (in uniform), Vice-Chancellor Friedrich von Payer (to his right) and Wilhelm von Radowitz, head of the Reich Chancellery, in the background, to the right of the Chancellor, in Berlin, in October 1918.

In order to prevent the Reich from experiencing a revolutionary episode, the high command suggested, from the very beginning, September 28, the implementation of reforms in the empire, in particular by the establishment of a parliamentary regime, while the vice-chancellor of the Reich Paul von Hintze proposed the democratization of the empire in order to allow the continuation of the conflict, then to conclude a peace with the Western Allies guaranteeing the eastern conquests of the victorious Reich on this front.

Everyone finally agreed to entrust the new government, resulting from parliament, with the dual mission of containing popular discontent and exonerating the OHL and its leaders from the defeat of the Reich. Thus, faced with the political and military developments of September, those mainly responsible for managing the conflict imposed the establishment of a government supported by the majority of parties represented in the Reichstag. (Note: These two soldiers, architects of the German conduct of the war, are sometimes referred to by this term.)

September 29, Reich Chancellor Georg von Hertling, known for his opposition to any internal reform before the end of the conflict, accepted the conclusions of the exchanges between civilians and military and assumed the consequences: (Note: Arriving in Spa on the 29th in the afternoon, he was, in fact, excluded from the discussions.) the same day, he proposed his resignation, accepted with eagerness by the emperor, while Ludendorff was urgent, wishing for the very rapid establishment of the government responsible for negotiating with the Allies. The next day, he was replaced by Max of Baden, supported by the majority of the Reichstag. (Note: This majority, established from the summer of 1917, is made up of deputies who are members of the liberal, social democratic and Catholic parliamentary groups, then in favor of a compromise peace.)

This cabinet multiplied, as soon as it took office, the measures intended to transform the authoritarian Reich, inherited from Bismarck, into a parliamentary monarchy: on October 24, an electoral reform established universal egalitarian suffrage in Prussia while October 28 a constitutional reform project is proposed, in order to transform the Reich into a parliamentary monarchy.

== See also ==
- First World War
- Bulgaria in World War I
- Oberste Heeresleitung
- Wilhelm II
- Paul von Hindenburg
- Erich Ludendorff
- Paul von Hintze
- Spa Conferences (First World War)
- Spa Conference (2-3 July 1918)

== Notes and references ==
=== Bibliography ===
- Fischer, Fritz (1970). Les Buts de guerre de l'Allemagne impériale (1914-1918) [Griff nach der Weltmacht] (in French). Translated by Geneviève Migeon; Henri Thiès. Paris: Éditions de Trévise.
- Jardin, Pierre (2008). "La fin de la guerre en Allemagne". Revue Historique des Armées (in French) (251): 35–46. doi:10.3917/rha.251.0035.
- Le Moal, Frédéric (2008). La Serbie du martyre à la victoire. 1914-1918. Les Nations dans la Grande Guerre (in French). Paris: Éditions SOTECA, 14-18 Éditions. ISBN 978-2-916385-18-1.
- Le Naour, Jean-Yves (2016). 1918: L'étrange victoire (in French). Paris: Perrin. ISBN 978-2-262-03038-4.
- Renouvin, Pierre (1934). La Crise européenne et la Première Guerre mondiale. Peuples et civilisations (in French). Paris: Presses universitaires de France.
- Schiavon, Max (2014). Le front d'Orient: Du désastre des Dardanelles à la victoire finale 1915-1918 (in French). Paris: Tallandier. ISBN 979-10-210-0672-0.
- Soutou, Georges-Henri (1989). L'or et le sang: Les Buts de guerre économiques de la Première Guerre mondiale. Paris: Fayard. ISBN 2213022151.
- Soutou, Georges-Henri (2008). "1918 : la fin de la Première Guerre mondiale ?". Revue historique des armées (254): 4–17. doi:10.3917/rha.251.0004.
