= Spa Conference (13–15 August 1918) =

The Spa conference of 13–15 August 1918 was a critical meeting between the German and Austro-Hungarian monarchs during World War I. This conference was significant as it marked a shift in the Central Powers' approach, with civil officials beginning to recognize the improbability of a military victory. The German Empire (Note: Between 1871 and 1945 the official name of the German national state was Deutsches Reich.) and its allies were increasingly exhausted, and recent offensives had failed on the Marne and the Piave in Italy. This situation, coupled with the massive arrival of American troops reinforcing the Entente forces, led the German Empire and the Austro-Hungarian dual monarchy to seriously consider the prospect of a compromise peace.

This was the third such conference held in Spa, the headquarters of the Oberste Heeresleitung (OHL), (Note: Supreme Command of the Army.) since the beginning of 1918. It followed previous meetings on 12 May 1918, and a second conference on 2 July 1918.

== Participants ==
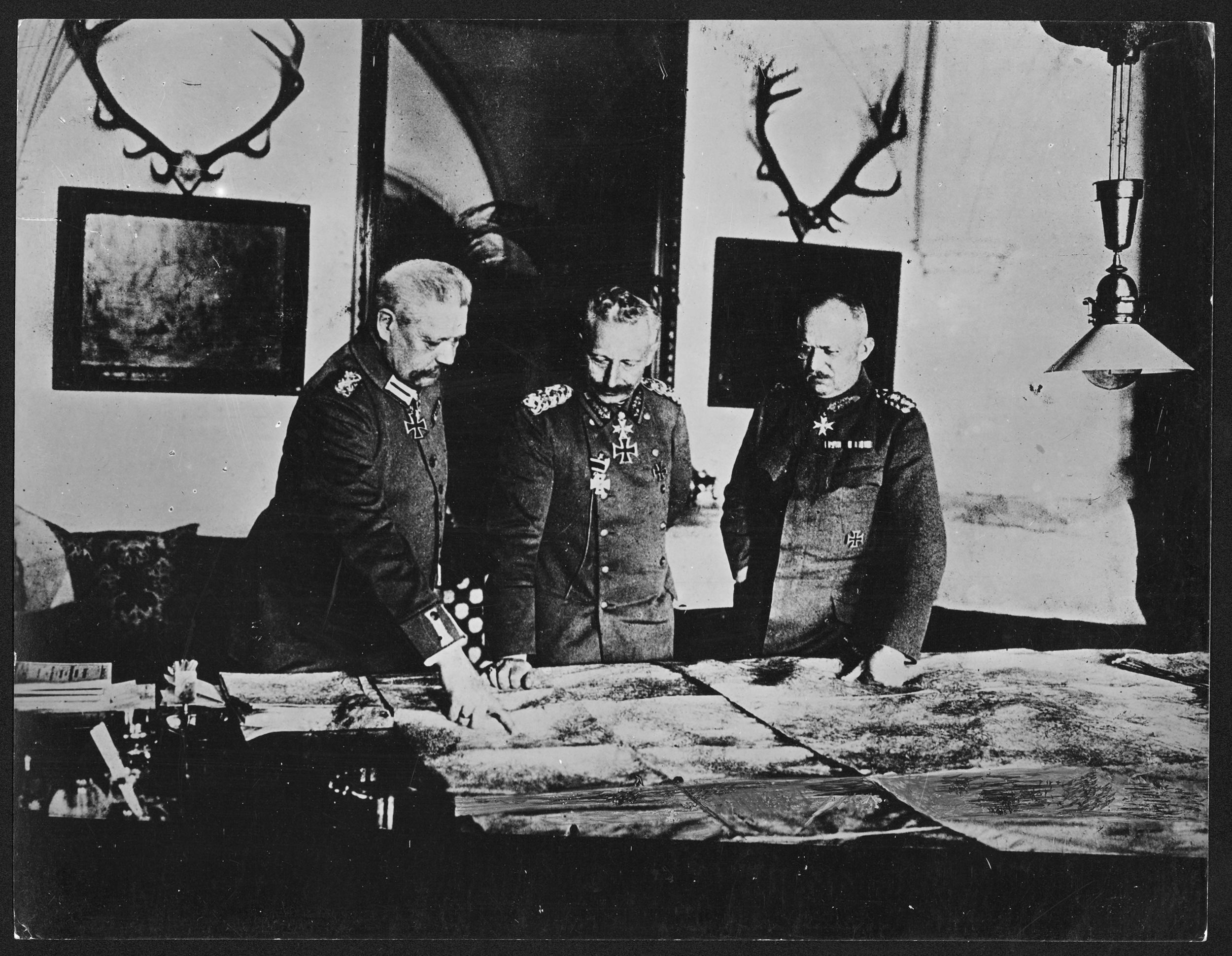
Hindenburg, Wilhelm II and Ludendorff (left to right), in Spa in 1918

The Spa Conference consisted of two distinct meetings. The first meeting, held on 13 and 14 August 1918, was a Crown Council of the German Empire, presided over by Emperor Wilhelm II. This council included key political and military leaders such as the military commanders Paul von Hindenburg and Erich Ludendorff (then First Quartermaster General), Chancellor Georg von Hertling, State Secretary of Foreign Affairs Paul von Hintze, and Imperial Crown Prince Wilhelm of Prussia. This meeting was convened in response to the defeat suffered on 8 August 1918. The second meeting, a German-Austro-Hungarian conference, took place on 15 August 1918.

=== Crown Council: 13 and 14 August ===
Summoned in response to the defeat on August 8, 1918, (Note: For Erich Ludendorff, it is a “day of mourning for the German army”.) the Crown Council convened on 13 August 1918, under the presidency of Emperor Wilhelm II. The council included key figures such as the military leaders Paul von Hindenburg and Erich Ludendorff (then First Quartermaster General), (Note: The position of first quartermaster general was created especially for Erich Ludendorff on 28 August 1916.) Chancellor Georg von Hertling, State Secretary of Foreign Affairs of the Reich Paul von Hintze, and Imperial Crown Prince Wilhelm of Prussia. The meeting was held amid growing concerns about the military setbacks experienced by the German Empire.

=== German-Austro-Hungarian Conference: 15 August ===
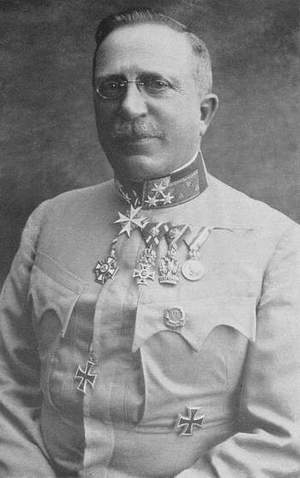
Arthur Arz von Straußenburg, Chief of Staff of the Army of the Dual Monarchy.

The second meeting occurred on 15 August 1918, following the arrival in Spa of Emperor-King Charles of Austria, accompanied by his Minister of Foreign Affairs, Stephan Burián von Rajecz, and the Chief of Staff of the Joint Army, Arthur Arz von Straußenburg. Upon their arrival, Emperor Wilhelm II donned an Austro-Hungarian uniform, while Charles wore a German uniform. This meeting marked the first and final direct engagement between the two monarchs since their previous conference in May.

The participants from the Crown Council on 13 August also took part in the discussions between the two principal figures of the Central Powers. (Note: The Quadruple brought together the Reich and its allies, Austria-Hungary, the Ottoman Empire and Bulgaria.)

== Context ==
=== Military failures of the Central Powers ===
During the spring and early summer of 1918, the Central Powers experienced a series of setbacks. In Italy, June saw significant failures, and by July, the situation on the French front also deteriorated. Over the months, the other fronts weakened as well. (Note: Erich Ludendorff issues on 20 July a directive aimed at prohibiting the vagrancy of soldiers breaking their ban behind the front lines.) On the Western Front, German forces faced increasing difficulties as desertion rates rose among their troops. The army, struggling with shortages, resorted to looting food supplies discovered during the spring offensives.

Efforts to bolster the Imperial Army through the conscription of the 1920 class and the reactivation of suspended workers failed to compensate for the substantial losses. Between March and July 1918, the German army suffered 226,000 casualties and nearly 750,000 wounded. Each month, since the spring, the Imperial Army experienced the loss of approximately 80,000 soldiers, after accounting for the new recruits and subtracting those who were wounded, killed, or ill. In response to these challenges, the German command decided to shift its strategic approach, reverting to a defensive strategy that had been prevalent before the start of 1918.

=== Discrepancy between politics and military ===
In Germany, the civilian population faced severe hardships due to reduced food rations. In June 1918, the daily ration of "war bread" was reduced to 160 grams. The black market thrived amidst these shortages, and the war economy was significantly impacted by the scarcity of raw materials. The army suffered from hunger and increasing desertion. In the countryside, deserters quickly organized themselves into armed bands, living off the inhabitants, calling into question security in the Hungarian countryside.

Following the military setbacks of 8 August 1918, Erich Ludendorff, a key military leader of the German Empire, acknowledged that the Central Powers could not secure a decisive victory against the Allies. (Note: This policy of concealing the extent of the defeat resulted in a growing gap over the days between the military and civilians.) Despite this admission, Ludendorff concealed the extent of the failure from Emperor Wilhelm II, who continued to advocate for the cessation of hostilities and the initiation of negotiations with the Allies. Ludendorff sought to mitigate public alarm about the dire military situation by presenting a revised strategy of defense aimed at gradually undermining the enemy's will to fight.

While military leaders sought to downplay the situation, civilian officials, particularly Vice-Chancellor Paul von Hintze, recognized the deteriorating state of the German Empire's allies and the increasing exhaustion of the German economy. (Note: The vice-chancellor is informed through multiple channels of the existence of multiple factors of internal disorganization, threatening the existing social order.) Hintze and other government officials were deeply concerned about the severity of the military situation. (Note: Initially, however, Vice-Chancellor Paul Von Hintze saw the shift from offensive to defensive as a simple change in strategy.) On 13 August Ludendorff informed German political leaders, including Wilhelm II, that the German Empire no longer possessed the military capability to achieve victory over the Allied forces. In response to civilian shock, the military downplayed the gravity of the situation while emphasizing the necessity of negotiating an agreement with the Allies.

=== Negotiations in progress ===
At the beginning of August 1918, the German Empire was engaged in negotiations with both its allies and Bolshevik Russia. Following the Spa agreements of May 1918, discussions between Germany and Austria-Hungary commenced on 9 July 1918, in Salzburg. These negotiations aimed to clarify the implementation of the political and economic terms outlined in the spring agreements. The Austro-Hungarians succeeded in diluting the economic provisions of the May agreements, while the financial authorities of the German Empire expressed concerns regarding the economic ramifications of these provisions.

Additionally, since March 1918, negotiations had been underway between representatives of Russian power and the central powers, primarily Germany, to detail the economic terms of the German-Russian peace treaty. By early August, these negotiations were nearing completion, with additional treaties being signed on 27 August 1918. During this period, the Allies publicly recognized various national committees, including the Czechoslovak committee.

== The last major Austro-German conference ==
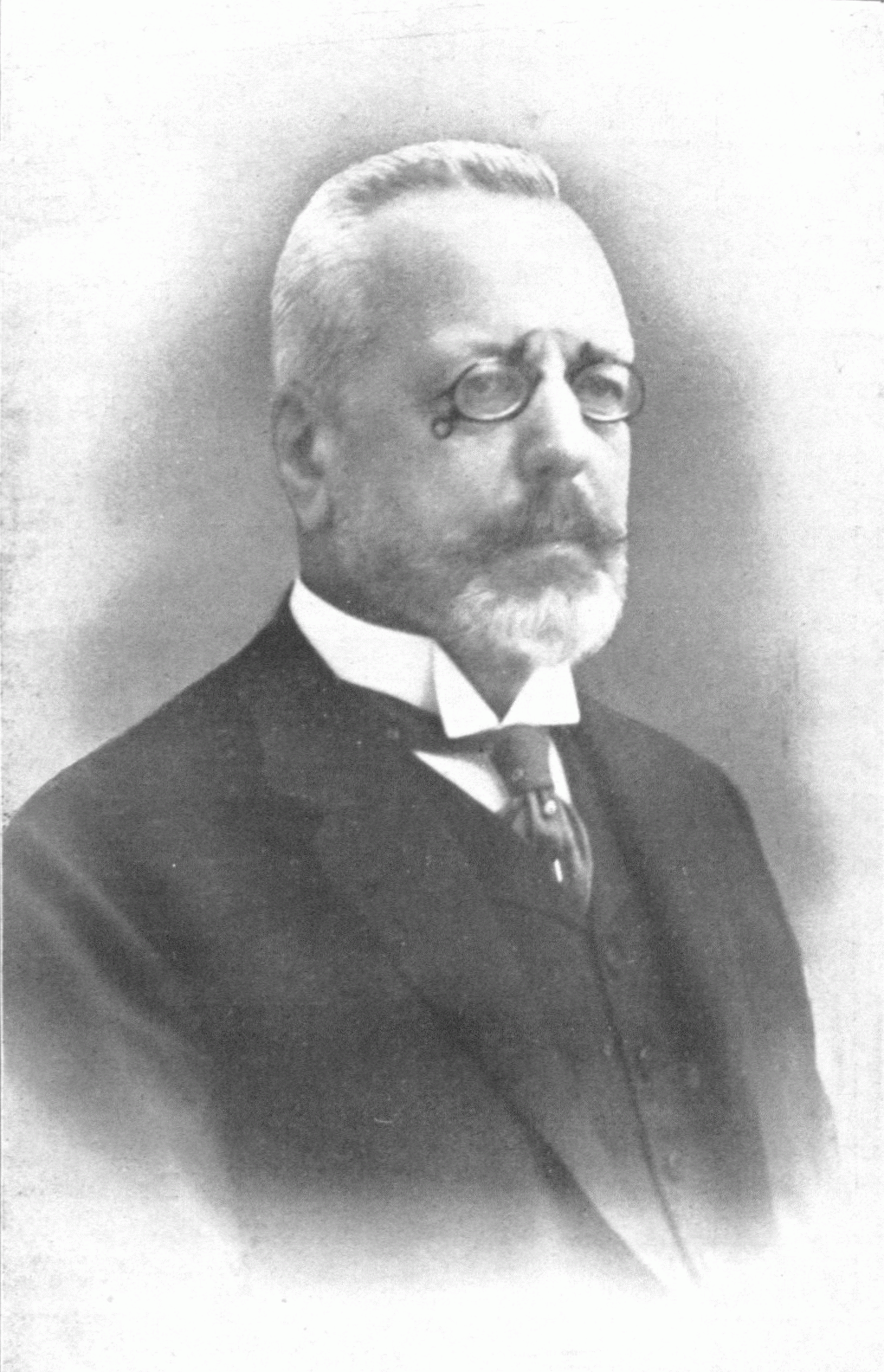
Stephan Burián von Rajecz, then Minister of Foreign Affairs of the Dual Monarchy, assisted Emperor-King Charles I to bring their country out of the conflict.

On 14 August 1918, Emperor-King Charles I of Austria arrived in Spa, accompanied by his Minister of Foreign Affairs, Stephan Burián von Rajecz.

This second phase of the conference followed the discussions that had taken place earlier that day during the Crown Council. The Crown Council convened under the presidency of Wilhelm II and brought together the key German and Prussian ministers.

=== Austro-Hungarian positions ===
From the outset, Emperor-King Charles I of Austria-Hungary, supported by his Minister of Foreign Affairs, announced the impossibility of the dual monarchy continuing to endure a fifth winter of war. Charles I expressed a strong desire to initiate peace negotiations as soon as possible, indicating his intention to extricate his empire from the conflict.

=== War aims during the summer of 1918 ===
During the Crown Council held on 13 and 14 August, Paul von Hindenburg asserted that German forces could maintain their occupation of significant portions of French territory. Chancellor Georg von Hertling and his State Secretaries aimed to negotiate a white peace in the West while preserving the status quo in the East, as defined by the peace treaties with Russia, Ukraine, and Romania concluded in 1918. The Polish question was also revisited during the Crown Council.

On 14 August, the fate of the territories under the control of the Quadruple Alliance was also discussed. Paul von Hintze proposed retaining German troops in Belgium as a bargaining chip, to be evacuated in exchange for the restitution of Germany's colonies upon the signing of a peace treaty. This context included provisions for war damages to be paid to Belgium. Additionally, discussions touched on the future of Poland, including the restoration of the Polish crown and the distribution of the kingdom's industrial assets.

=== Negotiations ===
During the discussions between military leaders, the German and Austro-Hungarian generals presented their respective operational plans, which were the subject of intense negotiation. The Austro-Hungarians aimed to launch a new offensive with Genoa as the final objective, while the German representatives emphasized the need to support the French front. The Germans favored waiting for a more advantageous moment, whereas the Austro-Hungarians advocated for the immediate initiation of peace negotiations to end hostilities. The policy adopted in the subsequent days involved waiting for a defensive success before proposing the commencement of peace negotiations.

== Issue ==
After the Crown Council of 13 and 14 August, and the conference on 15 August, the prevailing sentiment among German political leaders differed from that of the Austro-Hungarian officials. The German participants in the meetings were not aligned with the outlook of their Austro-Hungarian counterparts. The German imperial government contemplated a significant propaganda campaign aimed at both the German public and allied nations. This initiative was to be managed by a "propaganda committee" composed of prominent figures, tasked with projecting the German Empire's determination to continue fighting until achieving victory.

One of the first actions of this committee occurred on 21 August 1918, when Paul von Hintze sought to address the concerns of the political leaders in the Reichstag. Meanwhile, Wilhelm II opted to retreat to Wilhelmshöhe Palace near Kassel for rest on 16 August. (Note: This stay in Hesse was not unanimous among his close advisors, who suggested that he show up in Berlin.) Despite this, German statesmen largely ignored the Austro-Hungarian declaration on 15 August that the situation was "absolutely finished" for them. Austro-Hungarian Foreign Minister Stephan Burián advocated for an "immediate and direct" resolution, but he returned to Vienna with the understanding that the Germans were attempting to buy time.

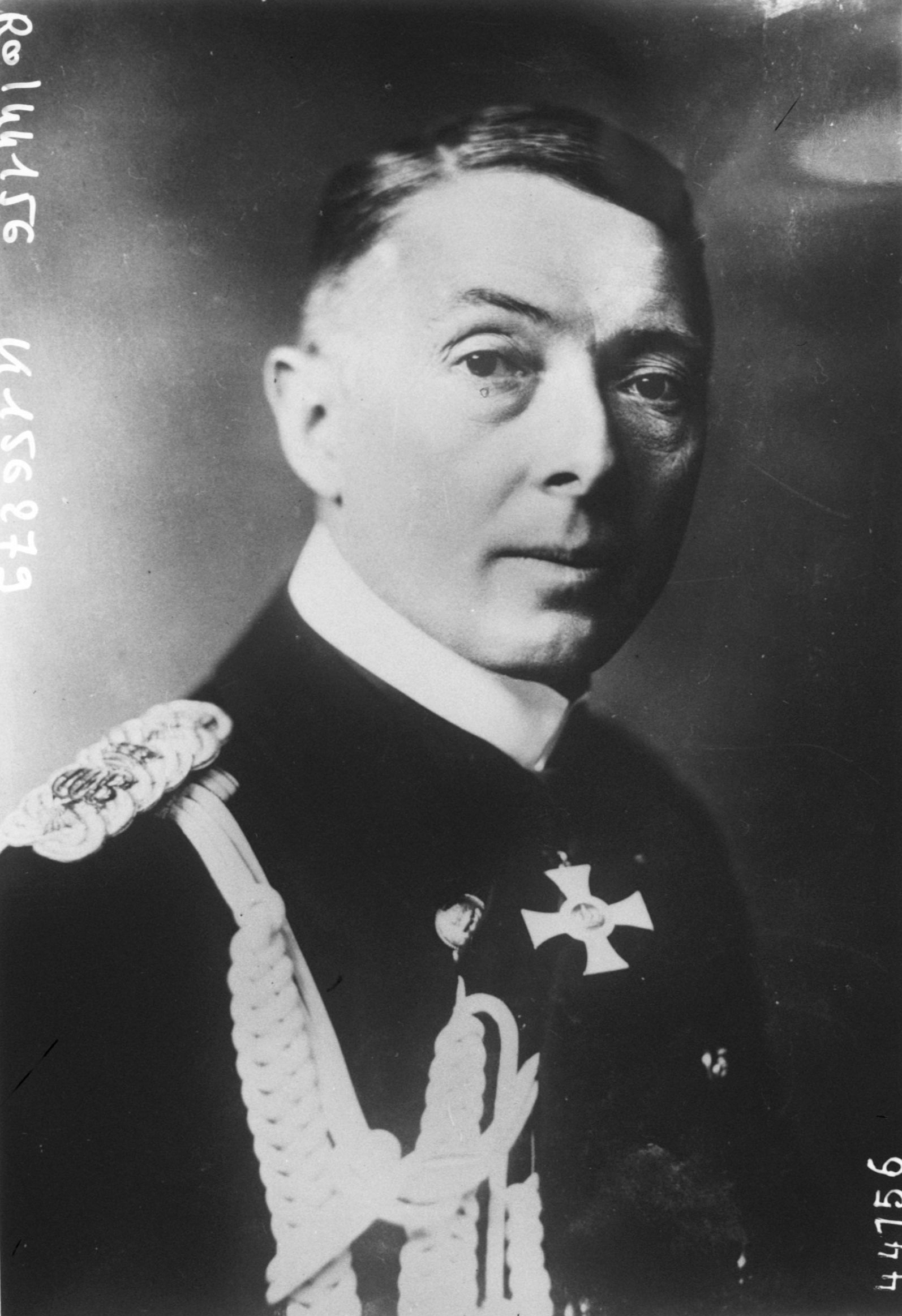
Paul von Hintze (photograph, 1915), then Reich State Secretary for Foreign Affairs.

=== Sending a request for negotiations ===
Despite the discord between the German Empire and its Austro-Hungarian ally, German representatives endeavored to influence Austro-Hungarian policy, albeit without success. From 15 August onward, Vice Chancellor and State Secretary Paul von Hintze, following the directives from the Crown Council, prepared and dispatched separate peace proposals to the United States. According to Hintze, these proposals were to be presented at an "opportune time" following the stabilization of the front, which German officials anticipated would result from a significant defensive victory on the Western Front.

On 21 August, with support from Bulgaria and the Ottoman Empire, Austro-Hungarian Foreign Minister Stephan Burián sent the proposed text of a peace offer to Berlin. German leaders attempted to obstruct this approach but were unable to address the concerns raised by Emperor-King Charles I in person. Consequently, on 14 September, after a month of negotiations between the two principal Quadruple powers, Burián issued a statement calling for the initiation of negotiations without a cessation of hostilities. The Allies rejected these terms.

German diplomacy sought to engage the Allies regarding the cessation of hostilities, but the Netherlands, under Allied pressure, refrained from mediating. This led Germany to pursue direct negotiations for an armistice. Simultaneously, the German government worked to prevent Austro-Hungarian officials from submitting a formal request for negotiations to the Allies.

== See also ==
- Mitteleuropa
- Spa Conference (2-3 July 1918)

== Bibliography ==
- "The Spa Conference: Results of the First Direct Verbal Negotiations Between the Allies and Germany". Current History. 12 (5): 765–772. 1920. ISSN 2641-080X. JSTOR 45328978.
- Renouvin, Pierre (1934). "La Crise européenne et la Première Guerre mondiale". Presses Universitaires de France, Coll. Peuples et Civilisations. 19: 500–502.
- Bled, Jean-Paul (2014). L'Agonie d'une monarchie: Autriche-Hongrie, 1914-1920. Paris: Tallandier. ISBN 979-10-210-0440-5.
- Bogdan, Henry (2014). Le Kaiser Guillaume II: dernier empereur d'Allemagne: 1859-1941. Paris: Tallandier. ISBN 979-10-210-0517-4.
- Fischer, Fritz (1970). The War Aims of Imperial Germany (1914-1918) [Griff nach der Weltmacht]. Translated by Migeon, Geneviève; Thiès, Henri. Paris: Éditions de Trévise.
- Jardin, Pierre (15 June 2008). "La fin de la guerre en Allemagne". Revue historique des armées (in French). 251 (251): 35–46. doi:10.3917/rha.251.0035. ISSN 0035-3299.
- Laparra, Jean-Claude (2011). "The other side of the parades: The command of the German army: realities and intersecting destinies 1914-1918". 14-18 Editions. ISBN 978-2-916385-77-8.
- Le Naour, Jean-Yves (2016). 1918 : L'étrange victoire (in French). Paris: Perrin. ISBN 978-2-262-03038-4.
- Schiavon, Max (2011). L'Autriche-Hongrie dans la Première Guerre mondiale: la fin d'un empire. Collection "Les nations dans la Grande Guerre". Paris: Éditions SOTECA 14-18. ISBN 978-2-916385-59-4. OCLC 770601364.
- Soutou, Georges-Henri; Duroselle, Jean-Baptiste (1989). L'Or et le sang: les buts de guerre économiques de la Première guerre mondiale. Paris: Fayard. ISBN 978-2-213-02215-4.
- Tulard, Jean (1997). Bérenger, Pierre (ed.). Les Empires occidentaux de Rome à Berlin. Histoire générale des systèmes politiques (1. éd ed.). Paris: Presses universitaires de France. ISBN 978-2-13-047852-2.

=== External links ===
- The First World War in Spa
