= Spa Conferences (First World War) =

SPA Conference

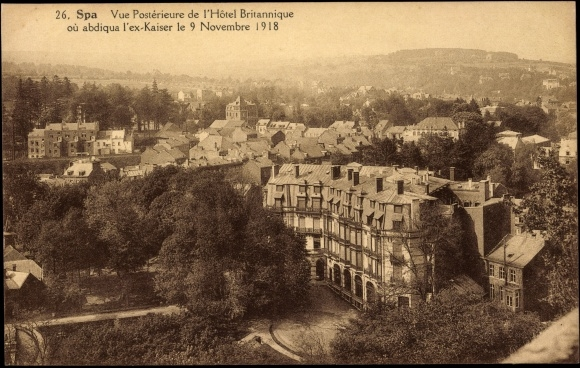
The British Hotel in Spa, headquarters of the Oberste Heeresleitung ("Supreme Army Command", OHL) in 1918, the last year of the First World War

The Spa Conferences (First World War) were a series of talks held by leaders of the German and the Austro-Hungarian Empires in Spa, Belgium in 1918. They were chaired by German Emperor Wilhelm II, with the assistance of the Reich Chancellor, and co-chaired by the Emperor-King Charles I of Austria. They brought together ministerial officials and high-ranking military personnel from both empires. According to the German imperial government, these conferences were intended to define the policy pursued by the empire and its Quadruple Alliance partners. (Note: The historian Pierre Renouvin defines the Quadruple as the central powers in the period between the October 5, 1915 and the September 29, 1918, chronological milestones of the Bulgarian intervention in the world war.) They sought to organize the territories captured by the Central Powers by determining which areas would be formally incorporated into the German Empire or Austria-Hungary, and which would remain outside direct annexation, but fall within their respective spheres of influence.

== The German general staff at Spa in 1918 ==
At the request of the Dioscuri Paul von Hindenburg and Erich Ludendorff, (Note: Inseparable from each other in the eyes of German public opinion, these two soldiers were likened to the Dioscuri of mythology by war propaganda.) German Emperor Wilhelm II issued an order transferring the Oberste Heeresleitung (OHL) to Spa in 1918.

=== A Strategic Choice ===
The military leaders of the Reich carefully weighed the choice of Spa as headquarters of the OHL. At the beginning of 1917, Erich Ludendorff considered establishing its headquarters in Spa, but he chose Bad Kreuznach, which at the time was better served by telephone and telegraph, allowing the supreme command to wage war virtually in real time.

While OHL strategists were preparing the offensives planned for the beginning of 1918, the question of moving the German high command to Spa was raised again. The city had numerous hotels able to accommodate the German army’s staff services. It was also connected to the railway network and benefited from greater proximity to the front, which members of the general staff could reach more easily.

=== Installation in Spa ===
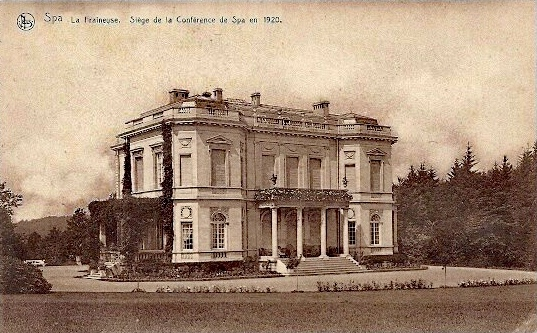
Château de la Fraineuse, the official residence of Wilhelm II.

The installation of the general staff services and its main officials began in February. On 8 March 1918, Hindenburg and Ludendorff arrived on site. The two military leaders were living in town, each having settled in a requisitioned villa. However, the next day, the Dioscuri went to Avesnes-sur-Helpe, the command centre of the army groups promised to be engaged in the offensives planned for spring. They were joined by Wilhelm II on 12 March and the emperor moved to the Villa Neubois, with the Château de la Fraineuse used as his official residence.

Spa and its region had quickly brought together the services of the general staff of all the armies of the Reich in the field. The operations section began its preparations for installation at the Grand Hôtel Bretagne on 8 February 1918. The other services were scattered throughout the region. The air force command were located in Verviers, while the town of Avesnes served as a forward command post. Finally, the Valenciennes Museum of Fine Arts was regularly used for officer training.

== Participants ==
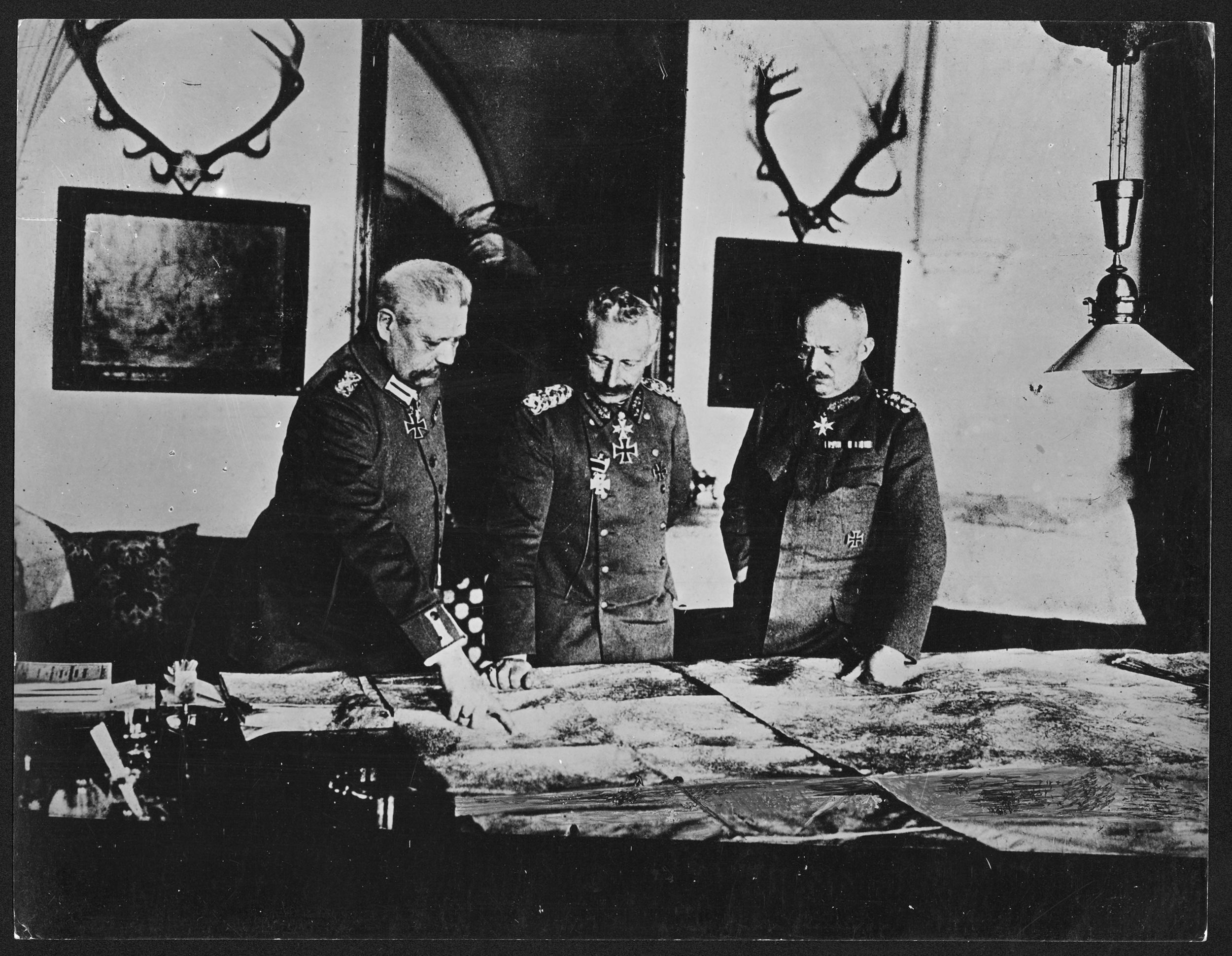
From left to right, Paul von Hindenburg, Wilhelm II, and Erich Ludendorff in Spa in 1918.

During the four main conferences of 1918, German and Austro-Hungarian civil and military officials took part in the talks. Each of the parties involved tried to assert their points of view during sometimes tense exchanges.

=== Presidency of emperors ===
The four conferences were chaired by Wilhelm II, the German Emperor. During the German-Austro-Hungarian meetings of 12 May and 14–15 August, Wilhelm II shared the presidency with Charles I, Emperor of Austria and King of Hungary. This co-presidency allowed the House of Habsburg to maintain the appearance of an alliance between partners placed on an equal footing. This was done by maintaining, in defiance of the reality of the balance of power, the fiction of an Austria-Hungary still able to weigh on the general policy of the Quadruple. (Note: By 1918, the dual monarchy was totally exhausted by the prolonged conflict. A year earlier, in April 1917, a report by Ottokar Czernin had already highlighted the Austro-Hungarian situation, which was considered worrying at the time.)

Officially co-chaired by the two emperors, the conferences of May and August had allowed the German Emperor to demonstrate the predominance of the Reich in the alliance linking it to the dual monarchy. During the conference of 14–15 August, Wilhelm II presented himself to Charles I in an Austro-Hungarian uniform, while Charles wore a German uniform. (Note: This show of friendship masked major differences over the conduct of the war at that point in the conflict) During these meetings, the monarchs set the guidelines for relations between the two empires, establishing the general terms of the agreements in principle between the two monarchies, which their advisers had to further specify during subsequent negotiations.

=== Civilians ===
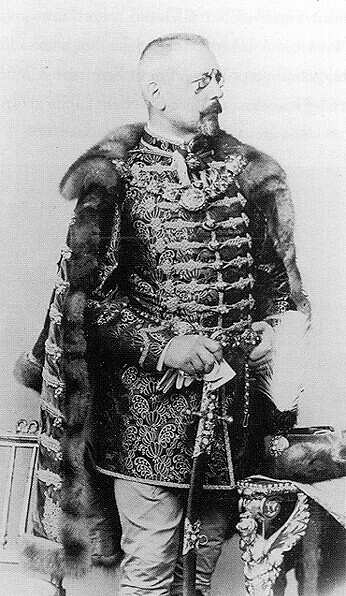
Stephan Burián von Rajecz, Austro-Hungarian Minister of Foreign Affairs, here in Hungarian hussar uniform, assists Emperor Charles I in defending the interests of the dual monarchy in the face of German demands.

The Reich government were represented by the Reich Chancellor, Georg von Hertling. He was assisted by the Secretary of State for Foreign Affairs Richard von Kühlmann, followed by Paul von Hintze, who succeeded von Kühlmann on 9 July . Occasionally, there were Prussian ministers and close advisers to the Chancellor and the Secretary of State present.

Stephan Burián von Rajecz, Austro-Hungarian Minister of Foreign Affairs, assisted Charles I during the German-Austro-Hungarian meetings of 12 May and 14 August.

=== Military ===
The civil leaders of the two empires were not the only ones summoned to these conferences. Indeed, from the end of 1916, the Dioscuri, effectively exercising a "dictatorship" over the Reich, attended all government meetings organized by the chancellor at the request of the emperor. Thus, Paul von Hindenburg and Erich Ludendorff were present at all four meetings; the two German strategists were sometimes assisted by their main collaborators: Paul von Bartenwerffer, Erich von Oldershausen, and Detlof von Winterfeldt.

The Austro-Hungarian Chief of Staff, Arthur Arz von Straußenburg, accompanied his emperor on 14 August. This was the only one of the four conferences attended by a senior Austro-Hungarian soldier.

== The Conferences ==
Several conferences were organized in Spa by the German government; historiography retains four main ones, summoned in May, July, August and September of 1918. During two of them, only representatives of the German and Prussian governments were invited; the other two were joined by Emperor-King Charles I.

=== Four conferences ===
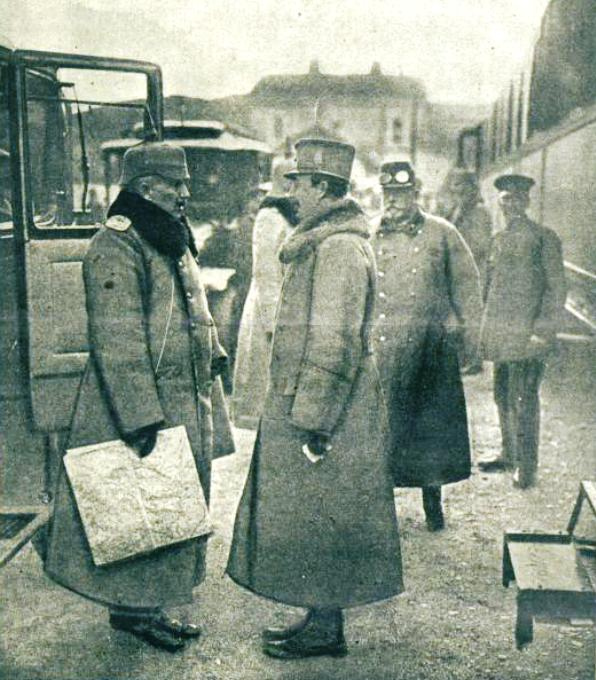
Meeting between Wilhelm II and Charles I in 1918.

The four conferences can be classified into two groups: the German imperial governmental conferences, which brought together the political and military leaders of the Reich and the last two official meetings of Emperor Wilhelm and Emperor-King Charles I, which were theoretically on an equal footing.

Thus, the conferences of 2–3 July, and 29 September, as well as the 13 August, the first day of the conference in August, were similar to the councils of the German imperial crown, in which the Dioscuri, the main organizers of the Oberste Heeresleitung, participated.

In addition to these German government conferences, two German-Austro-Hungarian meetings took place on 12 May and 14–15 August.

Relatively closely spaced in time from each other, they nevertheless took place in completely different political and military contexts: the May conference resulted in the dual monarchy being placed under supervision, while the July meeting was held while the Reich still hoped to impose its peace conditions on the Allies. In fact, a final offensive was planned to be launched in Champagne on 15 July 1918. The August conference was held when the German and Austro-Hungarian armies had exhausted the means of their respective empires, in men and equipment, and showed themselves incapable of confronting the Allied breakthroughs, present or future. The September conference was held against the backdrop of the Bulgarian armistice and victorious Allied offensives on all fronts held by the Reich, the Dual Monarchy and the Ottoman Empire: while Allied troops exploited their victories in Macedonia, the Allied troops deployed on the Western Front pushed back exhausted German units towards the borders of the Reich.

=== Preparations ===
The civil and military German officials that convened in the spa prepared carefully for each of the conferences.

In preparation for the 12 May conference with Emperor Charles and his Foreign Minister, Reich officials held numerous preliminary meetings. The German objective, which was to secure the double monarchy's vassalization to the Reich, necessitated extensive negotiations in the days preceding the conference. These negotiations took place at the Reich Chancellery and the German Foreign Ministry headquarters, involving members of the German and Prussian governments on one side, and Hindenburg and Ludendorff on the other.

While the conference had brought together German political, economic and military officials, the preparatory meetings were more limited, involving only the senior military and political leaders of the Reich: the Chancellor, the Secretary of State (or his deputy), the Minister of War, and the Dioscuri. For example, the conference of 2–3 July intended to definitively oust Richard von Kühlmann, was planned on 1 July during a meeting between the Minister of War, the Dioscuri, and Chancellor Georg von Hertling. At this meeting, Hindenburg and Ludendorff informed Hertling of their refusal to work with Kühlmann, and the Chancellor agreed to his removal.

== Main axes ==
=== Constant affirmation of German war aims ===
Each conference constituted the opportunity to formulate German war aims: the control of Belgium, Poland, the vassalization of Austria-Hungary and the constitution of a Mitteleuropa, a vast European economic power under complete political and economic control of the Reich.

The achievement of war aims constituted a cornerstone of German foreign policy until the final weeks of the conflict. Indeed, the four main conferences confirmed the imperialist and expansionist policy of the Reich and its allies. Those who were in favour of seeking a compromise, not only with the Allies, but also with the members of the Quadruple, were in fact systematically dismissed by Paul von Hindenburg and his colleague Erich Ludendorff, who then exercised a military dictatorship in the Reich.

On 12 May, Wilhelm II and the Dioscuri took Charles I through a veritable "Road to Canossa". Then, on 3 July, the Dioscuri obtained the resignation of Richard von Kühlmann, who had just taken an official position in favor of a compromise peace with the Allies, and his replacement by Paul von Hintze, leader of the Pan-Germanists. Later, on 29 September, in a context marked by the Bulgarian defection and the rapid reconquest of Serbia by the Allies, the political and military leaders of the Reich, then militarily defeated and economically strangled by the Allied blockade, were convinced of the need to open negotiations with the Allies to put an end to hostilities. These same officials, however, continued to defend keeping the provisions obtained during the peace negotiations signed by the members of the Quadruple with Russia, Ukraine and Romania.

Furthermore, it appeared to German officials that the war must allow the integration of the Reich and the dual monarchy into Mittleuropa. Thus, from the middle of 1916, German political leaders aspired to complete the process of political alignment of the dual monarchy with the Reich, (Note: From the 1900s onwards, the dual monarchy could no longer undertake anything successfully without the support of the Reich.) thus completing the edifice aimed at strictly controlling the dual monarchy, reducing it to the rank of "another Bavaria". (Note: The Kingdom of Bavaria enjoyed a special status within the Reich, but this status nevertheless placed it in a subordinate position to the Kingdom of Prussia.) Despite the fierce opposition of the Emperor-King Charles I, the process of placing the dual monarchy under strict supervision came to an end. In fact, the conference in May, convened thanks to the revelation of The Sixtus Affair (Note: Ottokar Czernin, the Austro-Hungarian Foreign Minister, revealed the existence of secret talks with France, causing a huge scandal and renewed tension between the Reich and the dual monarchy.) sanctioned the adoption of this political, military and economic supervision. (Note: The details of the customs union between the Reich and the Dual Monarchy were negotiated in Salzburg between 9 July and 15 October 1918, when the talks were finally suspended.)

Despite consensus on the objectives pursued during the conflict, the exposition of these war aims also allowed each member of the German government to defend positions that were sometimes divergent with those of other German imperial authorities: the satelliteization of certain territories appeared satisfactory for some, mainly the military; while the representatives of the German Ministry of Foreign Affairs were in favor of the privileged use of commercial weapons as a means of controlling the territories thus anchored to the Reich.

=== A deteriorating situation ===
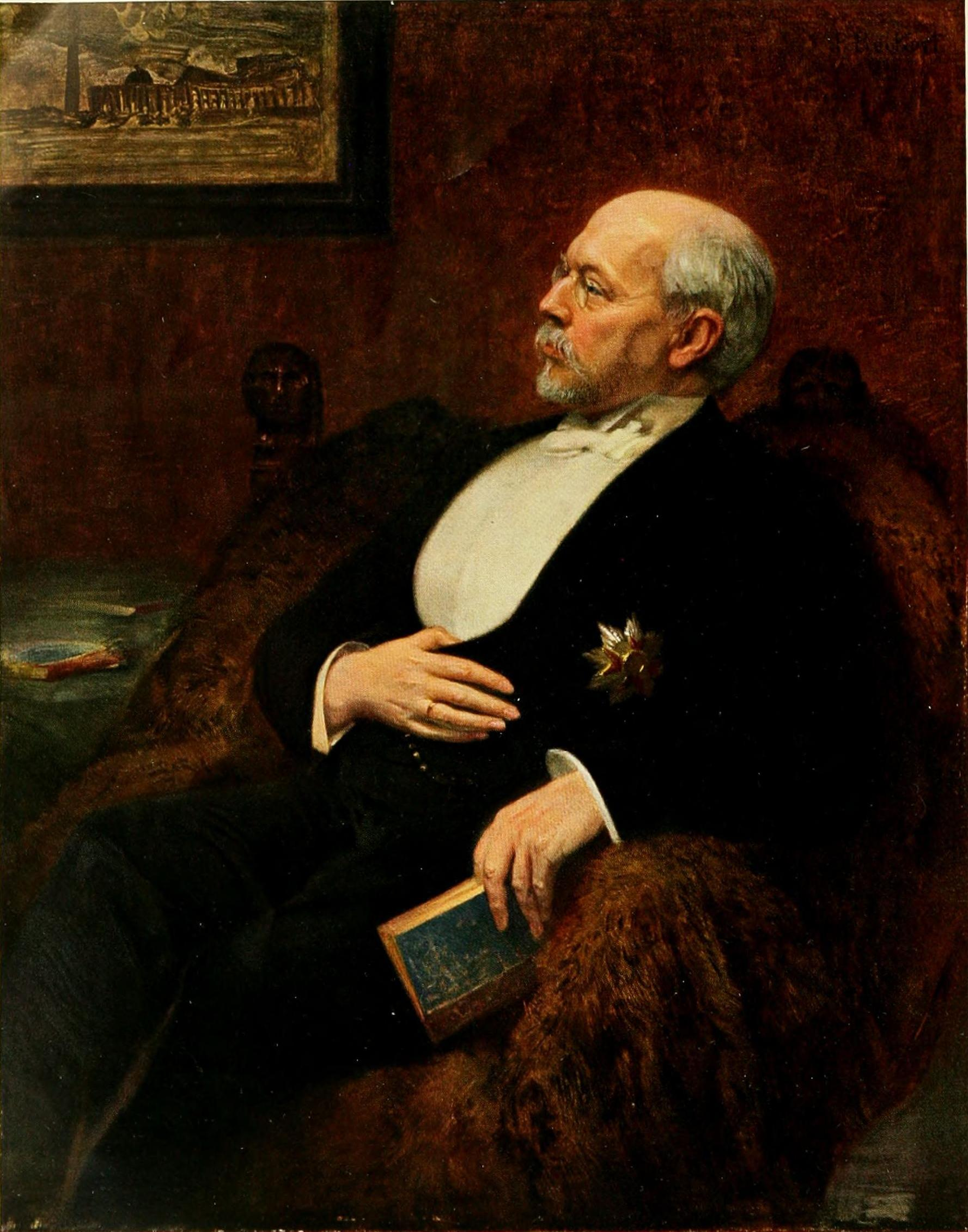
Georg von Hertling, here in a portrait painted in 1908, attended, as Imperial Chancellor, the four Spa conferences.

The conferences also provided the opportunity for members of the civilian government to explain to the military the deterioration of the internal situation of both the Reich, and Austria-Hungary. They also allowed the military to expose certain aspects of exhaustion to civilians.

During the council of the German crown meeting on 14 August, Chancellor Georg von Hertling presented the internal situation of the Reich, which had been engaged in the conflict since the summer of 1914. He insisted in particular on the brigandage which raged in the countryside, the bands of plunderers seizing the harvests of helpless peasants. The food situation was also generating high inflation, while the Germans could no longer buy anything due to shortages.

In addition, the moral crisis experienced by the front quickly reached the country, notably through letters from soldiers to their families, informing them of the reality of the military situation and the absurdity of the orders given by the command. The dissemination of Allied propaganda in the Reich also contributed to demoralizing German units.

Finally, during the month of September 1918, Erich Ludendorff, the main leader of the German general staff, was affected by the diplomatic failures suffered during the multiple attempts to open negotiations with the Allies. According to the neurologist who examined him at the request of his collaborators, but without his knowledge, during the month of September 1918, he suffered from severe depression.

The dual monarchy was also experiencing a worrying internal situation at the beginning of 1918. In fact, the civilian populations were suffering a severe shortage, despite the rationing put in place since the loss of Galicia at the end of the summer of 1914. This rationing contributed to straining relations between Austria and Hungary, despite the renewal of the Ausgleich the previous year.

=== Search for an honorable peace ===
The negotiators chosen by the Reich, along with Emperor Wilhelm II, set the conditions by which they affirmed their readiness to get out of the conflict. Their counterparts from the dual monarchy, placed under strict political and military control, were sometimes in agreement.

From the Allied success of 8 August, 1918, the conference's aim was to define a clear political line, not only among Reich officials, but also with the leaders of the dual monarchy. Rejecting any idea of negotiation with the Allies until August 1918, the German government then considered opening negotiations, with a view to concluding a compromise peace. On 13 August, misinformed by Erich Ludendorff, the Reich government agreed to the concessions that he was ready to grant to his interlocutors from the opposing camp. Only the evacuation of the Longwy- Briey (Note: This industrial area, located in Meurthe-et-Moselle, has been occupied by the Reich since August 1914.) steel basin was envisaged by the German government. The other territories occupied by the Reich and its allies were not mentioned.

The last two conferences, that of the 13th, 14th and 15th of August and that of September 29, were marked by the rebellion of members of the civil government against the Dioscuri Hindenburg and Ludendorff. The military neglected the seriousness of the internal situation in the Reich. Chancellor Georg von Hertling, supported by his ministers, multiplied initiatives towards the army command to impose an end to the conflict, without success. Alongside these internal exchanges, German leaders needed to take into account the increasingly insistent desire of their Austro-Hungarian counterparts, to withdraw from the conflict as quickly as possible, and at any cost.

The continued deterioration of the military situation from August 8, 1918, pushed OHL military officials to request the opening of armistice negotiations. From the middle of August, German military leaders experienced moral despondency. They still hoped to succeed in forcing the Allies to open negotiations. An orderly retreat, allowing the installation of units on solid defensive positions, could have forced the Allies to open negotiations, with a view to peace in Western Europe. A goal was to guarantee the positions conquered during the conflict, in the Balkans, and in Russia.

Finally, during the last conference, that of September 29, the hopes of Paul von Hintze and the members of the von Hertling cabinet, were swept away by the confessions of Erich Ludendorff. Ludendorff abruptly announced to them that the imperial army was no longer able to sustainably and effectively contain the multiple Allied offensives and to control the internal situation. This had been demonstrated by the first Allied incursions into the Reich. (Note: Allied long-range artillery fire and increasingly frequent air raids hit Reich territory.) The military obtained the resignation of Chancellor Hertling, who was hostile to any negotiation with the Allies and to any internal reform before the end of the conflict. The appointment of Max of Baden to the post of Reich Chancellor was also made. Baden was charged with both the opening of negotiations with a view to the armistice and the implementation of political reforms, intended to transform the authoritarian Bismarckian Reich into a parliamentary monarchy.

== See also ==
=== Related articles ===
==== Conferences ====
- The conference of 12 May 1918
- The conference of 2 and 3 July 1918
- The conference of 13, 14 and 15 August 1918
- The conference of 29 September 1918

==== Other articles ====
- German Empire
- History of Austria-Hungary during World War I
- Stab-in-the-back myth
- Sixtus Affair
- Prince Maximilian of Baden
- Stephan Burián von Rajecz
- Georg von Hertling
- Paul von Hintze
- Richard von Kühlmann
- Charles I of Austria
- Wilhelm II
- Salzburg negotiations
- Fritz Fischer (historian)

== Notes and references ==
=== Bibliography ===
- Bled, Jean-Paul (2014). L'Agonie d'une monarchie: Autriche-Hongrie, 1914-1920. Paris: Tallandier. ISBN 979-10-210-0440-5.
- Fischer, Fritz (1970). Les Buts de guerre de l'Allemagne impériale (1914-1918) [Griff nach der Weltmacht]. Translated by Migeon, Geneviève; Thiès, Henri. Paris: Éditions de Trévise.
- Jardin, Pierre (2008-06-15). "La fin de la guerre en Allemagne". Revue historique des armées (in French) (251): 35–46. doi:10.3917/rha.251.0035. ISSN 0035-3299.
- Kennedy, Paul Michael (1989). Naissance et déclin des grandes puissances : transformations économiques et conflits militaires entre 1500 et 2000 [The Rise and Fall of the Great Powers]. Translated by Cochez, Marie-Aude; Lebrave, Jean-Louis (63 ed.). Paris: Payot, coll. Petite bibliothèque Payot.
- Laparra, Jean-Claude; Hesse, Pascal (2011). L'envers des parades: le commandement de l'armée allemande, réalités et destins croisés, 1914-1918. Paris: Éditions SOTECA. ISBN 978-2-916385-77-8.
- Le Naour, Jean-Yves (2016). 1918: l'étrange victoire. Paris: Perrin. ISBN 978-2-262-03038-4. OCLC 961212181.
- Renouvin, Pierre (1934). "La Crise européenne et la Première Guerre mondiale". Presses Universitaires de France, Coll. Peuples et Civilisations. 19: 500–502.
- Schiavon, Max (2011). L'Autriche-Hongrie dans la Première Guerre mondiale: la fin d'un empire. Collection "Les nations dans la Grande Guerre". Paris: Éditions SOTECA 14-18. ISBN 978-2-916385-59-4. OCLC 770601364.
- Soutou, Georges-Henri (1989). L' or et le sang: les buts de guerre économiques de la Première Guerre Mondiale. Nouvelles études historiques. Paris: Fayard. ISBN 978-2-213-02215-4.
