= Treaty of Berlin (27 August 1918) =

Supplementary treaty between the German Empire and Bolshevik Russia

German-Russian supplementary treaty to the peace treaty between Germany, Austria-Hungary, Bulgaria and Turkey on the one hand and Russia on the other
German: Deutsch-Russischer Ergänzungsvertrag zu dem Friedensvertrage zwischen Deutschland, Österreich-Ungarn, Bulgarien und der Türkei einerseits und Rußland anderseits Russian: Германско-русскiй добавочный договоръ къ мирному договору между германiей, австро-венгрiей, болгарiей и турцiей съ одной стороны и россiей съ другой
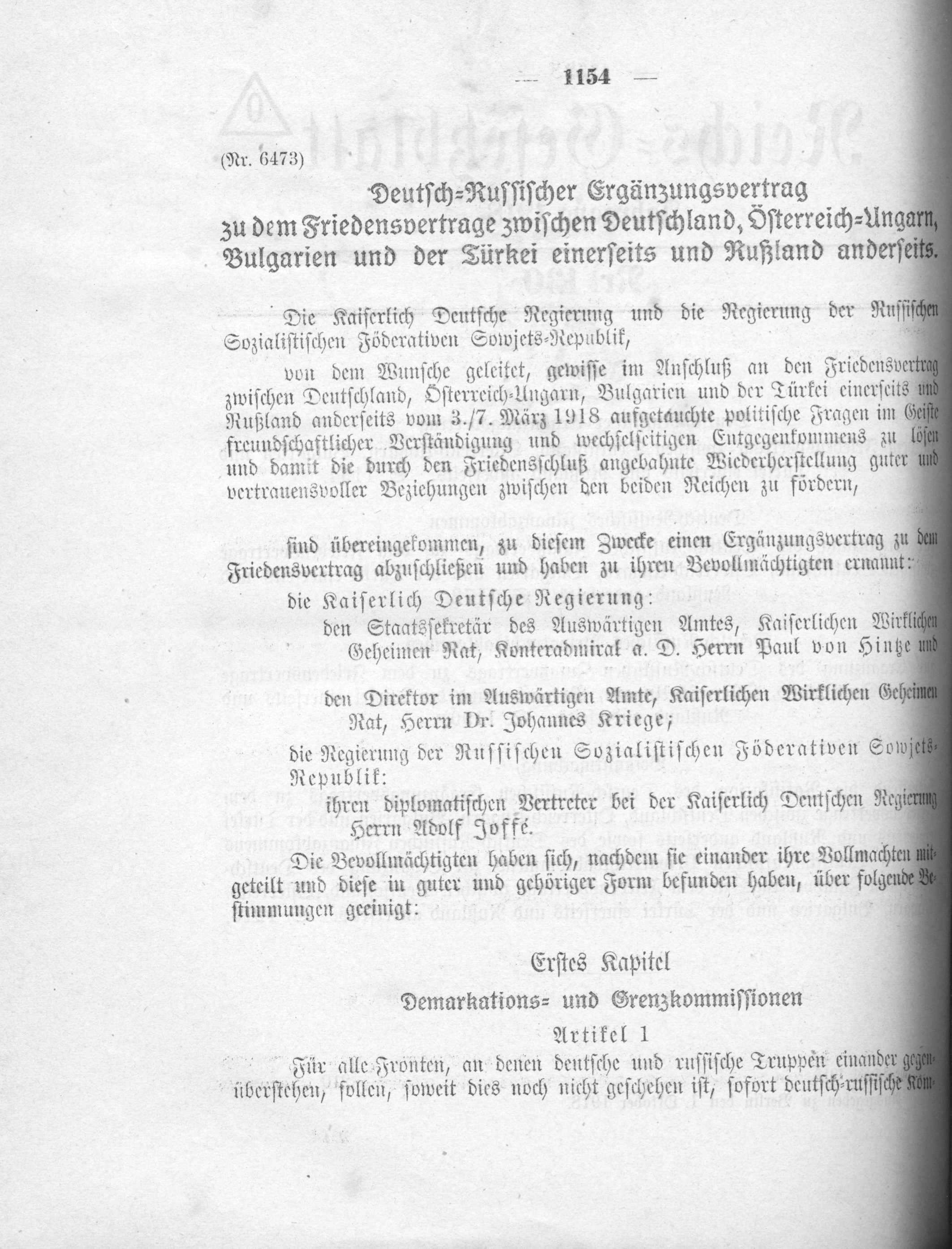
- Scan from the Reichsgesetzblatt of Germany, 1918, containing a copy of the first page of the Treaty of Berlin of 27 August 1918.
- Type: Supplementary peace treaty
- Context: World War I
- Signed: 27 August 1918
- Ratified: 6 September 1918
- Effective: 6 September 1918
- Condition: Exchange of instruments of ratification
- Parties: German Empire; Russian SFSR
- Languages: German, Russian

Full text
- :de:Deutsch-Russischer Ergänzungsvertrag zu dem Friedensvertrage zwischen Deutschland, Österreich-Ungarn, Bulgarien und der Türkei einerseits und Rußland anderseits at Wikisource

The Treaty of Berlin of 27 August 1918 was an agreement signed after several months of negotiations between representatives of the early Russian Soviet Federative Socialist Republic (RSFSR, colloquially known as 'Bolshevik Russia') and the German Empire (or 'Reich' (Note: Between 1871 and 1945, the official name of the German state was Deutsches Reich, later simplified to Reich.)). This treaty completed and clarified several political and economic clauses of the Treaty of Brest-Litovsk (3 March 1918), which had been left out of the winter 1917–1918 negotiations. The latter were aimed at ending the war between the Central Powers and Soviet Russia and clarifying the extent of Russia's territorial losses, but left unresolved the question of war indemnities due to the German Empire and its allies, primarily Austria-Hungary and their new mutual vassal, the Ukrainian People's Republic. Similarly, the nature of the new economic relations between the Central Powers and Bolshevik Russia was not discussed in depth at Brest-Litovsk.

Consequently, in accordance with the terms of the peace treaty signed in March 1918, negotiations aimed to regulate future economic relations between the Central Powers and Bolshevik Russia, and lead to the conclusion of an agreement between the Reich and its allies, on the one hand, and Bolshevik Russia, on the other. However, due to the rapid development of the conflict during September and October 1918, the provisions contained in the text of this treaty never de facto came into force. Nevertheless, this agreement laid the foundations for the Treaty of Rapallo between the Reich and Bolshevik Russia, which came into force in 1922.

== Context ==
=== Bolshevik power in the summer of 1918 ===
After the Bolsheviks seized power in November 1917, the new Soviet Russian leadership took over the reins of Russian government, to halt the process of disintegration of power. The conclusion of peace with the Central Powers also considerably weakened this new power.

Divided on foreign policy, the Bolshevik leaders also had to confront their opponents, including their former allies, the left-wing socialist-revolutionaries, who, like all opponents of Bolshevik power, were in favor of continuing the war. Faced with the Bolsheviks, who were in the minority on this issue, the Socialist-Revolutionaries stepped up their terrorist activities, committing numerous attacks during the spring and summer of 1918, both against the Bolshevik leaders (Note: For example, Lenin was wounded in an assassination attempt on 30 August 1918.) and against their German allies. On 6 July 1918, they assassinated Count Wilhelm von Mirbach, German ambassador to the Russian government.

=== German-Russian relations in 1918 ===
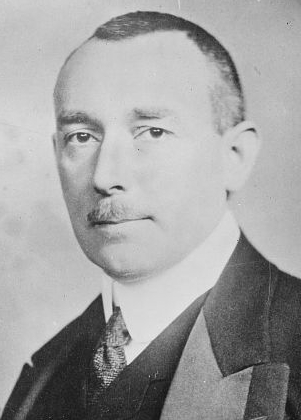
Karl Helfferich, ambassador to Moscow appointed in July 1918, was in favor of overthrowing the regime set up in the aftermath of the October Revolution.

Despite the conclusion of the Treaty of Brest-Litovsk, the Germans anticipated a rapid overthrow of the regime that had emerged from the October Revolution. It soon became clear to both Germans and Russians that the February treaty had left a number of uncertainties in relations between the two countries. Finally, the clauses of the Treaty of Brest-Litovsk provided for the opening of new negotiations to reach agreement on the nature of future economic ties between the two countries.

Consequently, in the spring of 1918, diplomatic relations were officially re-established between the Central Powers and the Council of People's Commissars, and ambassadors were exchanged between Moscow and Berlin. However, against the backdrop of the terrorist wave led by the Socialist-Revolutionaries, former allies of the Bolshevik party, the main German leaders were divided on the question of maintaining relations with the Russian government: Wilhelm II, Erich Ludendorff and Karl Helfferich, the new ambassador to Moscow, were in favor of overthrowing the Bolshevik government, by various means. (Note: Helfferich wanted to use a call for help from the Council of People's Commissars to occupy Moscow and overthrow its power, Ludendorff was in favor of immediate military action, while Wilhelm II was under pressure from the Baltics in his entourage.) On 29 April 1918, the Imperial German military had already backed the Hetman coup in Ukraine, overthrowing the legitimate government of the independent Ukrainian People's Republic (which the Central Powers had diplomatically recognised by the 9 February 1918 Peace of Brest), and establishing the Ukrainian State with the aristocrat Pavlo Skoropadskyi as a puppet.

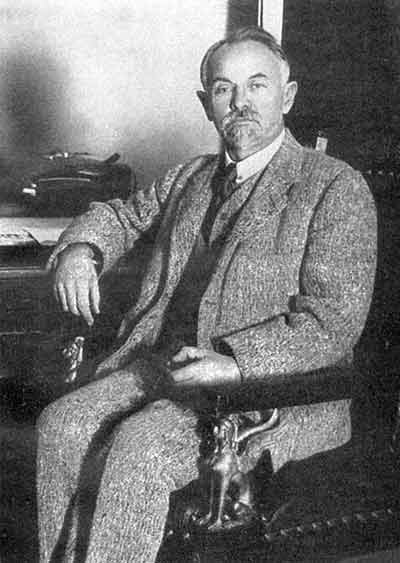
Leonid Krasin, one of the Soviet Russian negotiators.

Finally, in the summer of 1918, when the situation of the Bolshevik regime seemed critical, the Bolshevik negotiators Adolf Joffe and Leonid Krasin succeeded in convincing the Reich's main economic policy-makers at war, first and foremost Gustav Stresemann, of the solidity of the regime that had given them their mandate. With Stresemann supporting the plan to renew economic relations with Lenin's regime, the Reich drew closer to the Bolsheviks to avoid, or at least delay, the reconstitution of an Eastern Front, while the Imperial German Army stepped up operations in support of the Red Army, wherever the armies of the Central Powers were in a position to intervene. Following the assassinations in the summer of 1918 of the Reich ambassador in Moscow and the commander of German troops in Ukraine, the Reich government hesitated as to which policy to follow, with part of the Imperial Cabinet calling for the establishment of a conservative government favorable to the central powers.

=== German policies towards Soviet Russia and Ukraine ===
With the Central Powers having imposed a peace on the Russian Republic, sanctioning a major Russian territorial withdrawal, the German Empire was keen to renew trade relations with the new power in Moscow.

The conclusion of peace with the power that emerged from the October Revolution not only allowed German war aims to be realized in Eastern Europe, but also authorized the German Empire to pursue an active policy in Russia and neighboring regions, despite the uncertainties then surrounding the future of the Bolshevik regime. At a time when the Central Powers were victorious on the Eastern Front, some German officials aspired to see the Reich pursue an active policy in the new Russia. Thus, Paul von Hintze, Secretary of State (Note: In the Reich, the State Secretary acted as Foreign Minister.) from 9 July 1918, wanted to achieve the war aims of 1914, by relying on the Bolsheviks, the only political party opposed to the Triple Entente.

Moreover, in a context marked by preparations for the post-war period, the Reich's leaders, betting on the maintenance of an Allied blockade after the conflict, attempted to establish trade relations with the Russian authorities. Leading representatives of industry met on several occasions in the spring of 1918 to define the objectives sought by the German negotiators, as well as the legal framework for achieving these objectives.

At the same time, the Germans were preparing a military intervention in Russia; although they supported the Bolshevik regime, in order to take advantage of it in the Reich's best interests, German diplomats nevertheless anticipated its downfall, which would risk dragging Russia into chaos. The German military prepared for this intervention, whose main driving force would be the restoration of order.

Parallel to the objectives set by members of the government and the military, representatives of the Reich's heavy industry set out their specific demands after a meeting in Düsseldorf; fearing that the Reich would be ousted from world markets after the conflict, they called for the establishment of a continental market, economically underdeveloped and therefore unlikely to find competition for German manufactured goods. They suggested a proactive policy of substantial loans to Russia, to finance German exports to the country, as well as the establishment of an economic grouping to coordinate German efforts to take economic control of Russia and Ukraine.

=== Soviet Russian policies towards Ukraine and the Central Powers ===
Meanwhile, the peace negotiations between the Ukrainian State and Soviet Russia were taking place between 23 May and 4 October 1918. The Russian SFSR had already signed an armistice with the Central Powers at Brest-Litovsk on 3 March 1918, and after withdrawing from its territory, the Soviets had to decide how to interact with Ukraine as a de jure independent state, but de facto Austro-German protectorate. A preliminary peace was agreed on 12 July 1918. Favouring the right-wing Bolshevik faction that sought to accept the loss of Ukraine, Trotsky was steering towards permanent peace with Germany and Austria-Hungary, refusing to arm partisans recruited by the left. On the other hand, Ukrainian left-wing communists and Russian Left Socialist-Revolutionaries wanted to continue the war, a position Stalin seems to have supported, and that was strengthened by the news of acts of violent resistance by Ukrainian peasants. Lenin seems to have trusted neither the left ("hot-heads") nor the right ("opportunists"), and settled on a compromise: there would be no official resumption of hosilities with the Central Powers, but Lenin also approved the creation of a Revolutionary Central Committee that would command underground resistance in Ukraine.

Nevertheless, the leftist Soviets overestimated their ability to motivate and organise Ukrainian peasants into rebellion against the occupying German and Austro-Hungarian forces, which eventually suppressed the unrest with relative ease in most parts of the country (except northern Chernigov). Moreover, the Kuban Offensive had led to disastrous Soviet operations in the Caucasus in August 1918, allowing elements of Denikin's White Army (later coalescing into the Armed Forces of South Russia) to make significant gains. By October 1918, the right-wing Ukrainian Bolsheviks swayed Soviet foreign policy to focus all available military forces on countering the Whites on the North Caucasian front, rather than supporting partisan activities against Austro-German troops in Ukraine.

Meanwhile, during 1918–1920, Britain and France prioritised defeating or containing the Soviet-communist revolution, and focused on supporting Denikin's White Army in order to restore the Russian Empire as part of the Triple Entente. They had little interest in supporting an independent Ukraine to hold Bolshevik Russia in check, also because Denikin as a Russian nationalist considered Ukraine part of Russia. Even after Denikin's defeat in April 1920, the Entente switched allegiance to the Second Polish Republic (and thereby its claims to Eastern Galicia and Volhynia in Western Ukraine).

== Agreement clauses ==
The German-Russian agreement, the fruit of three months of negotiations, included both political and economic clauses, guaranteeing both the survival of the Bolshevik regime and the resumption of economic relations between Russia and the Central Powers. These clauses were supplemented by secret notes detailing the reciprocal obligations of the two contracting parties.

=== Negotiations ===
Faced with a catastrophic political and economic situation, Lenin's government proposed the opening of negotiations with representatives of the central powers. The Bolshevik representatives dangled the prospect of an alliance between the Reich and the new Russia, the delivery of arms and a far-reaching trade agreement.

The negotiations were held in Berlin and opened in mid-May 1918, in the presence of the Reich's State Secretary for Foreign Affairs, Richard von Kühlmann, and were closed by his successor, Paul von Hintze. The new Russian government delegated Adolf Joffe and Leonid Krasine, experienced Bolshevik militants, to defend the interests of the Moscow regime.

As the Reich became increasingly exhausted in futile offensives, its negotiators quickly became more conciliatory towards the demands put forward by their Russian counterparts. The Germans offered to supply Russia with cereal, coal, iron and oil, while rail links between the Caucasian territories occupied by the central powers and northern Russia were promised to be rapidly restored. However, it did not escape Joffe, the main Russian negotiator, that concluding the agreement on the basis proposed by the Germans would strengthen the Reich's economic control over Russia, which had already been significant before the war.

=== Political clauses ===
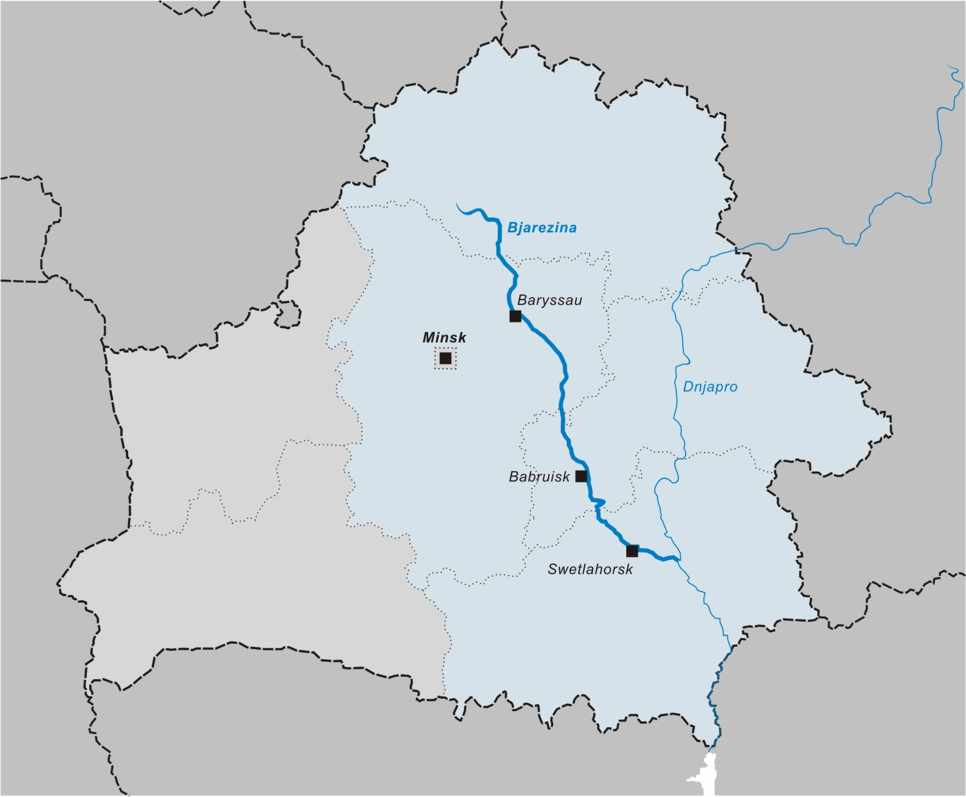
Berezina river, in modern Belarus

The Treaty contained several political clauses, regulating various geopolitical (territorial) questions that previously remained unspecified or unresolved by the Treaty of Brest-Litovsk. Under the Article 7 of the Berlin Treaty, Soviet Russia renounced sovereignty over Estonia and Livonia, as well as any interference in their internal affairs. Under the Article 2, it was agreed that all border issues between those regions and Soviet Russia shall be resolved by special commission. Under the article 3, it was agreed that German troops will evacuate territories east of the Berezina river, and it was also noted that further agreements will be made regarding future evacuation of German troops from territories on the western side of the same river. In several articles, various administrative questions were also resolved, regarding not only Estonia and Livonia, but and also Courland and Lithuania, since those two regions belonged to territories already renounced by Soviet Russia under provisions of the previous Brest-Litovsk Treaty.

Several political issues regarding relations of Soviet Russia with Finland and Ukraine were also regulated. Under the Article 13, Soviet Russia agreed to Germany’s recognition of Georgia as an independent state, which was at that time under German political and economic protection. In exchange for this recognition, the Reich agreed to return Baku to Russia, in exchange for a guarantee that a third of the oil produced in the region would be delivered to the German economy.

Finally, these clauses oblige the Reich to question its support for Krasnov's and Alekseyev's White Armies.

=== Economical clauses ===
The treaty of 27 August 1918 laid the foundations for the resumption of economic exchanges between the Reich and the new Russia. The Germans renounced compensation for German holdings in Russian companies nationalized by the decree of June 28, 1918.

However, despite this renunciation, the Russian government had to pay the Reich war indemnities of six billion gold rubles, both in gold and in goods.

== Application and consequences ==
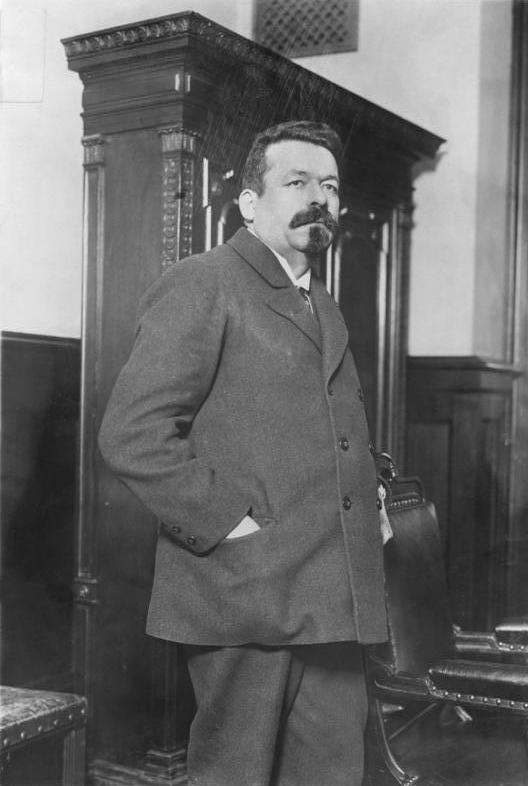
Friedrich Ebert, pictured here in December 1918, outlines the reservations of his party, the SPD.

Ratified by the contracting parties on 6 September 1918, it never came into force due to the defeat of the Reich in the following months. The Armistice of Rethondes obliged the defeated Reich to denounce all agreements and treaties signed by its representatives with Romania, Russia and the new states born at the beginning of 1918: Finland, the Baltic States and Ukraine.

=== Ratification ===
Ratification of the Treaty of 27 August by the Reich took the form of a simple government act. The treaty was not submitted to the Reichstag, as required by the Empire's constitution, for reasons of domestic policy; Friedrich von Payer, Vice-Chancellor of the Reich, wished to avoid a parliamentary debate on his foreign policy, and a possible collapse of the government in this debate. Only Friedrich Ebert, on behalf of his party, the Social Democratic Party, expressed reservations about the treaty's clauses and ratification procedures.

Despite these reservations, the treaty was ratified by the Reichstag Main Committee on 24 September 1918. (Note: For the first time, the Reichstag ratified international treaties signed by the government, the first tangible manifestation of the Reich's reform process, launched a few weeks earlier in the face of military defeat.)

Already on 22 September (1918), after the German Government had previously ratified the Berlin Treaty, provisions of Article 7 were put in effect regarding Livonia and Estonia, and on that day German Emperor issued a formal recognition of independence, addressed to the "United Assembly of Livonia, Estonia, Riga and Ösel" (German: Vereinigte Landesrat von Livland, Estland, Riga und Ösel), thus effectively recognizing a new client-state, created in Livonia and Estonia. That recognition was followed by a renewed attempt of local political leaders of Baltic Germans to create a wider state, by integration of Livonia-Estonia with the neighboring Courland into the United Baltic Duchy, that was proclaimed on 5 November (1918) in Riga, but that attempt failed, since new national states of Estonia and Latvia emerged in the region.

=== Expiration ===
The events of November 1918 quickly invalidated the terms of the treaty.

Shortly before, in September 1918, the Reich's political and military leaders were hoping to preserve the structure built up in Eastern Europe since the February peace for the benefit of the Reich: Paul von Hintze and Friedrich von Payer, supported by Gustav Stresemann, declared their determination to defend the eastern gains of the conflict.

However, article 15 of the 1918 armistice text obliged the Reich to withdraw from the treaty of 27 August 1918. The Allies considered this treaty to be a consequence of the peace of defeat imposed by the Reich on Russia. Parallel to the Allied demand, the Council of People's Commissars terminated the treaties binding Russia and the Reich on 13 November 1918, once the terms of the armistice between the Reich and the Allies were known in Russia.

=== Consequences ===
In the summer of 1918, the outcome of the German-Russian negotiations depended on the outcome of operations on the Western Front; this German-Russian agreement was a first step towards the German-Soviet relations of the 1920s.

While the Balkan front, poorly supported by the weakened Bulgarian army, collapsed following the Battle of Doiran, German negotiators obtained concessions from the states established following the break-up of the Russian Empire, placing these newly independent countries in strict dependence on the Reich.

Accepting the regime put in place following the October Revolution, and acknowledging the economic interests of Bolshevik-ruled Russia, the Reich's leaders were the first to recognize the power of the Council of People's Commissars. This recognition paved the way for a longer-term relationship of the German Empire (soon becoming the Weimar Republic in November 1918) with the Russian SFSR (which became the leading Soviet republic forming the Soviet Union in December 1922). (Note: Having recognized the new Russian regime as early as 1918, the Reich benefited from this anteriority and from early contacts with the Bolshevik leaders; these contacts continued after the end of the conflict.) This early recognition of Moscow's new government paved the way for the Treaty of Rapallo in April 1922, an agreement that would benefit both states over the following decade.

== See also ==
- Treaty of Brest-Litovsk
- Ober Ost
- Central Powers
- Russian Soviet Federative Socialist Republic
- Council of People's Commissars of the Soviet Union
- Paul von Hintze
- Karl Helfferich
- Richard von Kühlmann
- Adolph Joffe
- Leonid Krasin
- Kingdom of Lithuania (1918)
- Duchy of Courland and Semigallia (1918)
- South Caucasus
- Peace efforts during the First World War

== Sources ==
- Baumgart, Winfried (1966). Deutsche Ostpolitik 1918: Von Brest-Litovsk bis zum Ende des Ersten Weltkrieges. Wien: Oldenbourg.
- Fischer, Fritz (1970). Griff nach der Weltmacht [Les Buts de guerre de l’Allemagne impériale (1914-1918)] (in French). Translated by Migeon, Geneviève; Thiès, Henri. Paris: Trévise editions.
- Le Naour, Jean-Yves (2016). 1918 : L'étrange victoire (in French). Paris: Perrin. ISBN 978-2-262-03038-4.
- Michaelis, Herbert (1959). Ursachen und Folgen: Vom deutschen Zusammenbruch 1918 und 1945 bis zur staatlichen Neuordnung Deutschlands in der Gegenwart. Vol. 2. Berlin: Dokumenten-Verlag.
- O'Connor, Kevin (2003). The History of the Baltic States. Westport: Greenwood Press.
- Rauch, Georg (1974). The Baltic States: The Years of Independence: Estonia, Latvia, Lithuania, 1917-1940. London: Hurst.
- Renouvin, Pierre; et al. (Peuples et civilisations) (1934). La Crise européenne et la Première Guerre mondiale (in French). Presses universitaires de France.
- Soutou, Georges-Henri (1989). L'or et le sang : Les Buts de guerre économiques de la Première Guerre mondiale (in French). Paris: Fayard. ISBN 2-213-02215-1.
- Pipes, Richard Edgar (1997). The Formation of the Soviet Union: Communism and Nationalism, 1917–1923, Revised Edition. Harvard University Press. p. 392. ISBN 978-0-674-41764-9. Archived from the original on 16 July 2025.
- Sukiennicki, Wiktor (1984). East Central Europe During World War I: From Foreign Domination to National Independence. Boulder: East European Monographs.
- Snyder, Timothy (2003). The Reconstruction of Nations: Poland, Ukraine, Lithuania, Belarus, 1569–1999 (PDF). New Haven, CT: Yale University Press. p. 384. ISBN 978-0-300-12841-3.
