= Spa Conference (2-3 July 1918) =

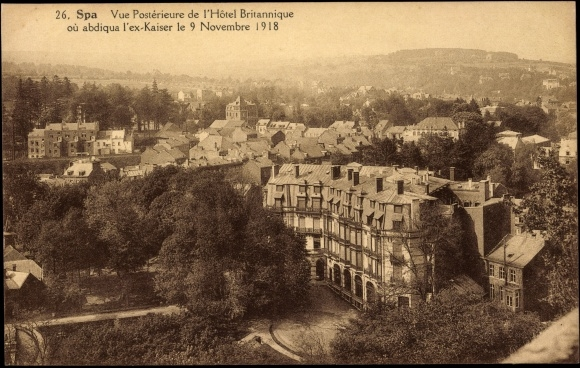
The British Hotel in Spa, where the conference was held on 2 and 3 July 1918.

The Spa Conference of 2-3 July, 1918, called "the great Spa conference" by Fritz Fischer , was the second of the four main meetings between the political and military leaders of the German Empire. (Note: Between 1871 and 1945, the official name of the German state was Deutsches Reich, simplified to "Reich" thereafter.) The conference was held in the summer of 1918, between Operation Michael and the Second Battle of the Marne, the two major German offensives at the end of the First World War. The participants were gathered in the town of Spa, Belgium by Emperor Wilhelm II, to reaffirm the objectives of the conflict, which was by then in its fifth year. The last imperial government supporters of a compromise peace were disavowed by the emperor, and their main representative, Secretary of State Richard von Kühlmann, was forced to resign. At the same time, the German Army high command (OHL) was preparing for its last offensive of the conflict, after the blows inflicted on the Allies in the spring. The conference was held during the last days of preparation for the Second Battle of the Marne (Note: The Champagne offensive of 1918 is also referred to by this term.), it was the last chance for German officials to reaffirm their belief in the Empire's victory.

== Context ==
At the beginning of 1918, the German army had achieved significant success on the Western Front. However, their victories were not decisive, and were undermined by the lack of offensive plans on other fronts. These successes were not the decisive victories that German strategists knew they needed to impose a peace in accordance with their imperialist ambitions.

This lack of decisive success pushed the Imperial government, confined to an increasingly decorative role, to seek a certain independence with regard to the war aims pursued by the military leaders of the German Army high command (OHL). Since the beginning of 1918, the government had tried to partially recover its autonomy, to the great discontent of the military leaders of Empire. (Note: Between Richard von Kühlmann and Erich Ludendorff, questions of precedence also added to the initially political dispute.) Kühlmann supported a compromise peace, but he was weakened by the revelation of compromising details about his private life in the Pan-Germanist press subject to the Dioscuri; Hindenburg and Ludendorff, then at the head of the General Staff.

=== Political context: the speech of June 24, 1918 ===
Kühlmann, then Secretary of State for Foreign Affairs, was aware of the growing military and economic impasse in which the Empire and its allies found themselves, and had been trying for months to prepare German public opinion for a compromise peace with the Allies.

His attempts to broker a peaceful solution earned him the hatred of the military, including Erich Ludendorff. On June 24, 1918, Kühlmann, visibly tired, formalized his position by giving a speech in the Reichstag, as part of the vote on the appropriations of his ministry. He expressed his skepticism about the victory of the Empire, calling for a compromise peace.

Kühlmann was hated for months by Pan-Germanist and imperialist circles, and was described by the Bavarian press as a "walking corpse". His speech triggered his ouster from the government in the following days. The majority of the Reichstag, notably the national liberals, led by Gustav Stresemann, broke away from him. The next day, Paul von Hindenburg informed Empire Chancellor Georg von Hertling of the soldiers' possible reaction to the position of the Secretary of State. (Note: For months, the military has wanted to get rid of Kühlmann.) Although Kühlmann was supported by left-wing parties in favor of a compromise peace, he found himself obliged to withdraw the next day, under pressure from the military. His supporters questioned his intentions, and the majority of right-wingers were not grateful for his retreat.

At the same time, negotiations between the German Empire and Austria-Hungary seemed to be at a standstill. Representatives of the dual monarchy withdrew from the agreements by the two emperors that spring.

=== Waiting for the victory of the German Empire ===
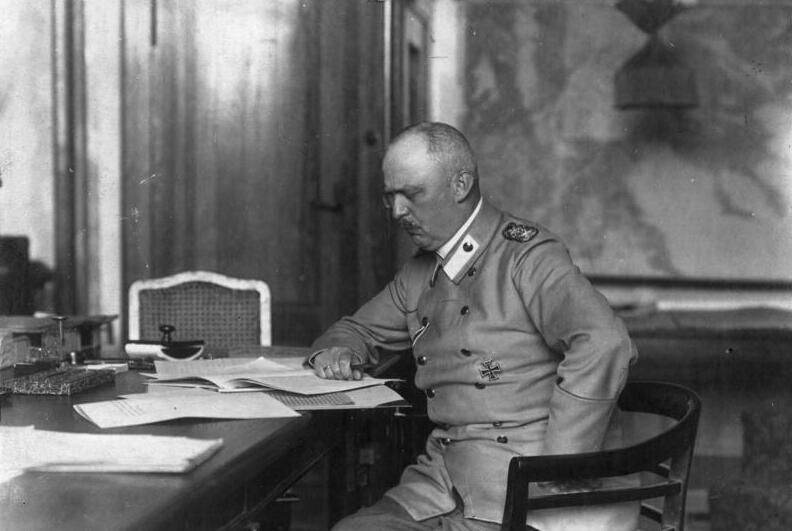
Erich Ludendorff, at his work table in 1918, wanted to lead the battle to annihilate the Franco-British forces, sought by Empire strategists since 1914.

During the months preceding the conference, the German Empire's political leaders issued multiple declarations calling for the opening of peace negotiations, to begin after a resounding victory over the Allies. These declarations clashed with the wishes of Hindenburg and Ludendorff, who supported peace only after total victory.

Ludendorff was the main spokesperson for the German hardliners, supporters of peace only after total victory. To meet these war goals, Ludendorff wanted to lead the great battle of annihilation which German strategists had dreamed of since the outbreak of the conflict in the West. The victory was to be achieved by shock troops and their unlimited tactical and strategic exploitation once the Allied front was broken. (Note: The strategic planning for this offensive did not specify a precise objective.)

On June 15, during the celebration of the thirtieth anniversary of his accession, Wilhelm II, in order to mobilize the Germans for the new and decisive battle, affirmed that the victory of the Empire was within reach and would mark a change of civilization. This was relayed by a significant part of the political class represented in the Reichstag: the Catholic Center, the National Liberals and the Pan-Germanists.

The occupation of vast portions of territory of the Allied Powers, as well as the victorious peace imposed on Russia at Brest-Litovsk and on Romania at Bucharest, comforted German officials in their policy, but misled them about the balance of power. The massive arrival of American soldiers on the Western Front reversed this balance to the disadvantage of the Empire and the Quadruple Alliance.

=== Military context ===
For months, military officials increased their attempts to achieve a decision on the Western Front. After the failure of May, Erich Ludendorff was in favor of launching an offensive against the British army.

However, the successes encountered by the troops of the Central Powers destroyed the German army and contributed to the morale crisis suffered by German units since the beginning of 1918. Soldiers at the front and their officers were disappointed by the non-decisive nature of the successes achieved since March 1918. This disappointment was reflected in the reports reaching the Dioscuri, which reported the words exchanged by soldiers on the trains, emphasizing the soldiers' wishes for a peace settlement.

The decline in numbers forced German strategists to deploy increasingly younger or older men on the front line, all less and less motivated. Young men were sometimes forced to go to the front, while older soldiers, members of units deployed to occupy conquered territories, showed no enthusiasm for front-line service.

=== Economic context ===
For almost three years, the Central Powers suffered from an increasingly restrictive Allied blockade, reducing the supply of food and raw materials for the war economy of the Empire and its allies.

On May 30, 1918, the economic ministries launched a major survey to assess the state of the Empire's strategic raw material reserves. The results reached the sponsors on June 29, including reports on how the control exercised by the Allies over the trade in raw materials was affecting the Empire's war effort.

== Participants ==
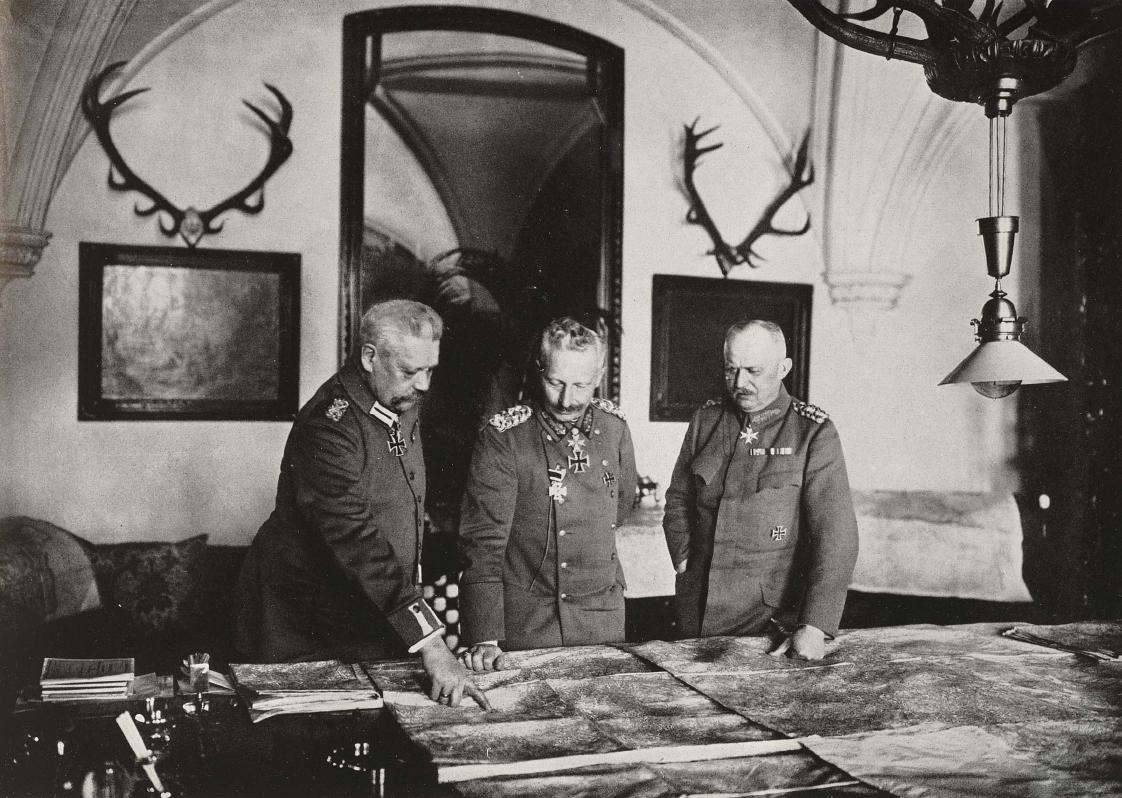
Wilhelm II, center, and the Dioscuri, Hindenburg on the left and Ludendorff on the right, in Spa in 1918.

During this meeting, chaired by Emperor Wilhelm II at the OHL headquarters in Spa, the Le Britannique hotel welcomed civilians and military personnel involved in German war policy. However, the Dioscuri quickly informed the Emperor and the Empire Chancellor of their wish to no longer participate in the crown council, if Kühlmann was present.

=== Civilians ===
In addition to Wilhelm II, the conference brought together Chancellor Georg von Hertling, the Undersecretary of State at the Chancellery, Wilhelm von Radowitz, the Imperial Minister for the Navy, Eduard von Capelle, and the representative of the Federal Foreign Office with the OHL, Friedrich Rosenberg.

These representatives of the imperial government were joined by Hermann von Stein, Prussian Minister of War.

=== Military ===
Representing the military were the Dioscuri, Paul von Hindenburg and Erich Ludendorff, (Note: Paul von Hindenburg and Erich Ludendorff appeared to German public opinion to be inseparable, like the Dioscuri of Greek mythology.) assisted by their main collaborators, Paul von Bartenwerffer, Erich von Oldershausen and Detlof von Winterfeldt.

== Decisions ==
During this conference, German conflict management officials defined Empire policy while a large-scale offensive, the last, was planned by the Dioscuri for the middle of the month.

=== Kühlmann's resignation ===
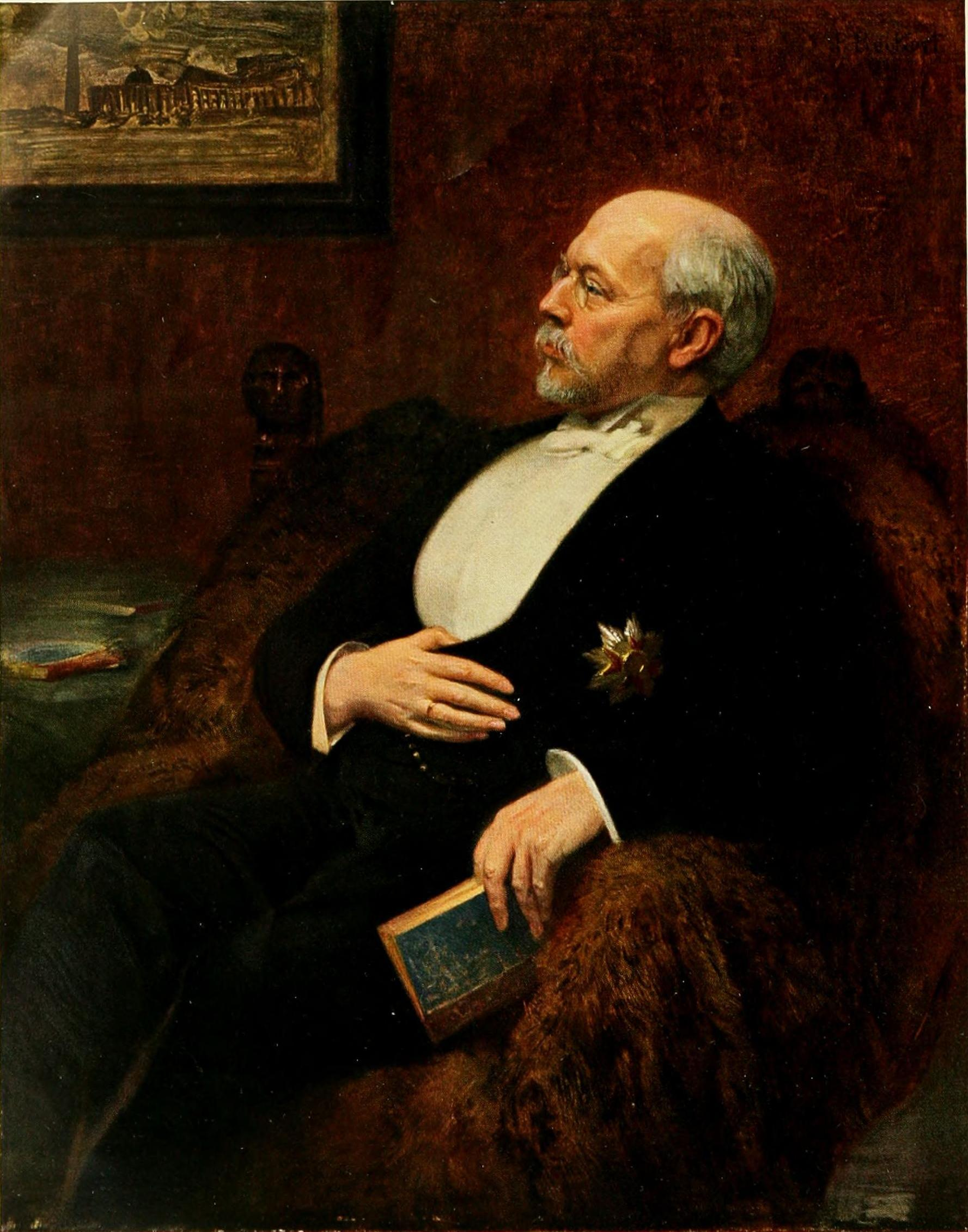
Georg von Hertling, painted here by the painter Paul Beckert in 1908, aligned his policy with the wishes of the high command.

The resignation of Secretary of State Kühlmann was decided on July 1, 1918 during a meeting between the high command, mainly Paul von Hindenburg and Erich Ludendorff, and Chancellor Georg von Hertling. He was released from service the next day by the emperor and the chancellor in the face of the scale of the controversy unleashed by his speech of June 24 before the Reichstag. On July 8, during an interview between Wilhelm II and his Secretary of State, the emperor, totally subjugated by the Dioscuri, announced to his minister his dismissal.

Following Kühlmann's departure, the foreign policy of the Empire was entrusted to a fervent supporter of war aims achievement, Paul von Hintze, recalled for the occasion from his post as ambassador to Denmark. This appointment entrusted a convinced nationalist with the achievement of the objectives decided at the conference. The new State Secretary received the support of the majority of the Reichstag when, on July 13, he defended before this assembly an increase in war credits. This idea was rejected only by the members of the USPD.

This resignation aroused numerous reservations among main members of the Empire cabinet. Chancellor Georg von Hertling and Vice-Chancellor Friedrich von Payer foresaw "serious internal consequences" following this dismissal. (Note: Neither of them specified their thoughts.) On July 3, the SPD, through its main speaker, Philipp Scheidemann, recalled in a speech the situation of the population of the Empire, then called for the conclusion of an "honorable peace".

=== Reaffirmation of war aims ===
The war aims of the Empire were reaffirmed, while their realization seemed within reach. The Eastern program appeared on the verge of being achieved, and Western war aims were reaffirmed.

Belgium should have been placed under strict German control, and militarily occupied, (Note: Great Britain had entered the war in 1914 to enforce Belgian neutrality.) or even partially annexed. (Note: Georges-Henri Soutou asserts the opposite. In his view, the German ministers and soldiers meeting on 2 and 3 July 1918 said they wished to guarantee Belgium's territorial integrity.) The kingdom promised a partition between Flanders and Wallonia, both integrated into the German customs union, while the Belgian railways were to be ceded to the Prussian railway administration. Certain portions of its territory, in particular an area going from the German border to the region of Liège, were promised direct annexation to the Empire, just like the iron basin of Briey, a constant claim of the German Empire since the outbreak of hostilities.

In the East, Ukraine was independent of Russia and supplied the Central Powers with foodstuffs. (Note: This supply made the question of its evacuation particularly delicate.)

During this conference, representing a new opportunity to define the Empire's war aims, the participants recorded the discontinuation of talks with the American government. Talks had been initiated in the Spring by the Secretary of State by indirect means. (Note: The Netherlands, which had remained neutral, acted as an intermediary between the Germans and the Americans.) Requests for American clarifications received no response.

== Notes and references ==
Notes

=== Works cited ===
- Fischer, Fritz (1970). Les Buts de guerre de l'Allemagne impériale (1914-1918) [Griff nach der Weltmacht]. Translated by Migeon, Geneviève; Thiès, Henri. Paris: Éditions de Trévise.
- Jardin, Pierre (2008-06-15). "La fin de la guerre en Allemagne". Revue historique des armées (in French) (251): 35–46. doi:10.3917/rha.251.0035. ISSN 0035-3299.
- Le Naour, Jean-Yves (2016). 1918: l'étrange victoire. Paris: Perrin. ISBN 978-2-262-03038-4. OCLC 961212181.
- Renouvin, Pierre (1934). "La Crise européenne et la Première Guerre mondiale". Presses Universitaires de France, Coll. Peuples et Civilisations. 19: 500–502.
- Soutou, Georges-Henri (1989). L' or et le sang: les buts de guerre économiques de la Première Guerre Mondiale. Nouvelles études historiques. Paris: Fayard. ISBN 978-2-213-02215-4.

== See also ==
- Oberste Heeresleitung
- Spa, Belgium
- War guilt question
