= Paul von Hintze =

German naval officer and diplomat (1864–1941)

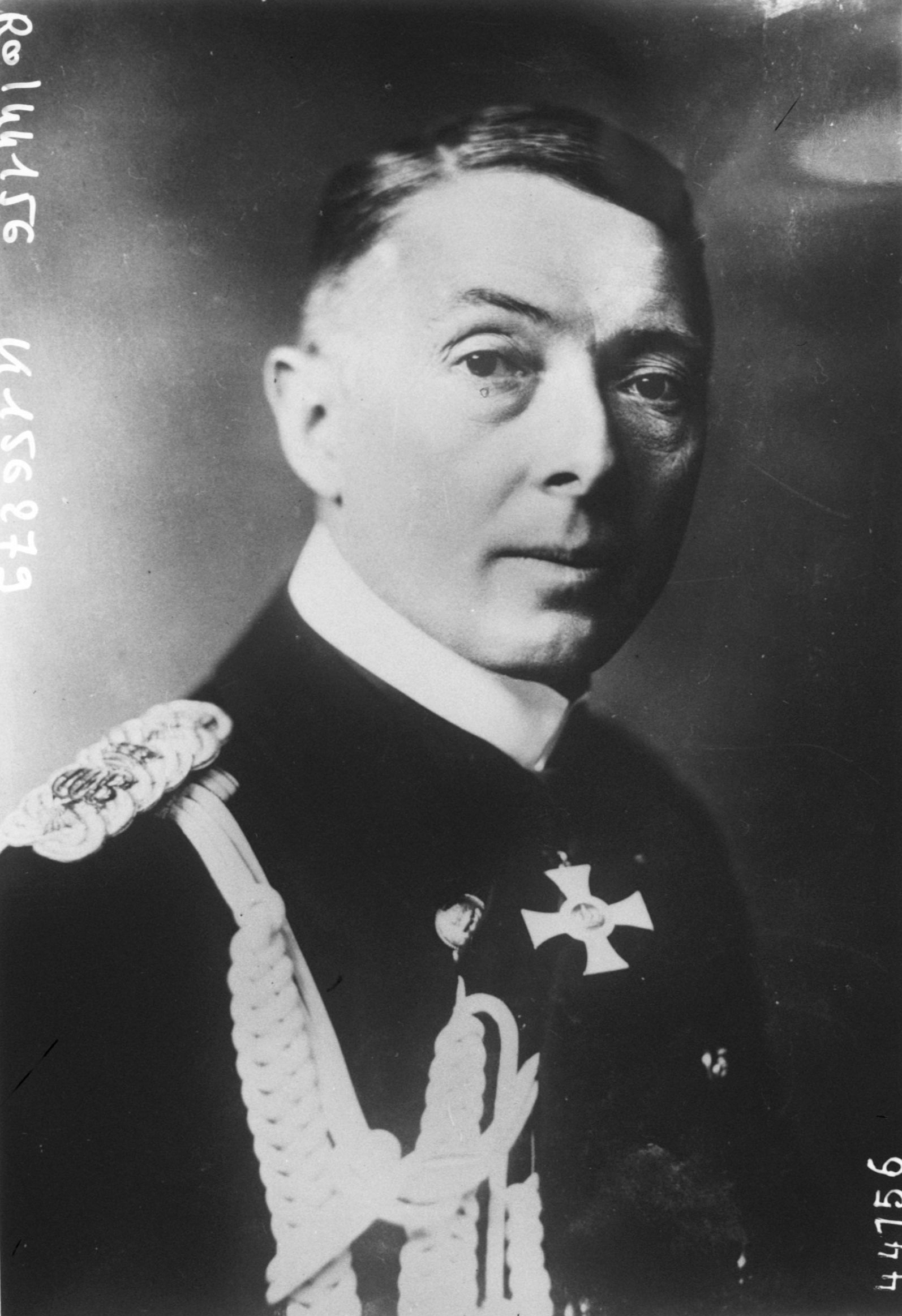
- Admiral Paul von Hintze, 1915

State Secretary for Foreign Affairs
- In office 8 July 1918 – 3 October 1918
- Monarch: Wilhelm II
- Chancellor: Georg von Hertling
- Preceded by: Richard von Kühlmann
- Succeeded by: Wilhelm Solf

German Minister to China
- In office 1914 – 25 March 1917
- Monarch: Wilhelm II
- Preceded by: Johann Friedrich von Haxthausen
- Succeeded by: Suspended due to World War I

German Ambassador to Mexico
- In office 17 January 1911 – 20 July 1914
- Monarch: Wilhelm II
- Preceded by: Radolf von Kardorff
- Succeeded by: Heinrich von Eckardt

Personal details
- Born: 13 February 1864 Schwedt/Oder, Province of Brandenburg, Kingdom of Prussia
- Died: 19 August 1941 (aged 77) Meran, Kingdom of Italy
- Occupation: Naval Officer, diplomat

Paul von Hintze (13 February 1864 – 19 August 1941) was a German naval officer, diplomat, and politician who served as Foreign Minister of Germany in the last stages of World War I, from July to October 1918.

== Upbringing ==
Paul Hintze was born in 1864 in the little town of Schwedt approximately eighty miles northeast of Berlin. The Hintze family was part of the hardworking German middle class of the Prussian country towns. Schwedt only had ten thousand inhabitants but because the city is located on the Oder River it benefited from trade. Paul's father owned a tobacco plant, making cigars of the raw tobacco he imported. He also had a seat in the City Council. The Hintze family was one of the best regarded and wealthiest in town. Paul attended the humanistic Gymnasium (high school) and graduated with a baccalaureate in 1882. Rather than serving the mandatory year in the military, he joined the navy as an eighteen-year-old. Paul struck his superiors as very smart and very tough. After basic training on the school ship Prinz Adalbert, Hintze sailed the seven seas for the next twelve years, in which he saw the coasts of Africa, the Middle East, North and South America. In 1894 the navy lieutenant (Kapitänleutnant) studied at the Naval Academy at Mürwik, a school for which very few officers had the honor of admission.

Among the many that trained and studied at the Naval Academy in Kiel there were several graduates worth mentioning for this story: Grand Admiral Alfred von Tirpitz (then Captain Tirpitz) graduated in 1865, von Hintze (then without noble title) in 1896. Karl Boy-Ed, eight years von Hintze's junior, joined the class of 1894. After serving in active duty in the Far East, Boy-Ed became German Naval Attaché in Washington in 1912 and worked for then Ambassador von Hintze in his partial responsibility for Mexico. Franz von Rintelen (although he never had a noble title), the son of a well-known Berlin banker, graduated in 1905. Rintelen was to become a notorious German sabotage agent in the United States in World War I. All three worked for Grand Admiral von Tirpitz who became the loudest voice clamoring for unrestricted submarine warfare in the Great War. After Paul Hintze completed his studies at the Naval Academy in 1896, he joined the Naval Command in Berlin.

== Military service ==
In 1898, Rear Admiral Tirpitz commissioned navy captain Hintze to join the East Asian battle group as a "Flaggleutnant," the liaison officer to the German Imperial Naval High Command. In this capacity Hintze faced an outraged Admiral George Dewey when the German navy obstructed Dewey's efforts to subdue the Spanish in the Philippines in the Spanish–American War. German ships had operated so close to the U.S. navy that Dewey had to employ searchlights, which gave away the American positions to the Spanish. Dewey also had declared a blockade and accordingly expected any naval vessel to allow search parties to board. The German navy rejected this as an infringement of international law. Hintze never commented on his confrontation with Dewey, which must have been so heated that news stories about it could be found twenty years later. According to newspapers, Dewey told the German naval officer "if he [German Admiral Otto von Diederichs] wants a fight he can have it now." Cooler heads prevailed. Rather than shooting out their differences, the German fleet found a way to compromise with the Americans and eventually left the Philippine theater. Ambassador Johann Heinrich von Bernstorff commented on the affair in his 1920 memoirs that the underlying cause of the aggression was that Germany tried to "acquire" the Philippine islands after the U.S. had declared it did not want to hold on to them in the long term. "[A] misunderstanding had occurred, as a result of which the Berlin Foreign Office had acted in perfect good faith. In the public mind in the United States, however, the feeling still rankled that Germany had wished to make a demonstration against their Government."

== Diplomatic Assignment to St. Petersburg ==
In 1903, the navy dispatched their thirty-nine-year-old and experienced naval captain Hintze to the German embassy in Saint Petersburg. "His social suaveness...his empathy for the idiosyncrasies of other people made him quickly establish friendly relationships." He had been a popular commander at sea. As the new naval attaché to St. Petersburg Hintze occupied a critical position in the embassy. Emperor Wilhelm II became extraordinarily interested in reports from Tirpitz's protégé. Hintze's assessment of Russian politics and the quality of his intelligence soon caused the Kaiser to use Hintze for most sensitive missions between the German government and the Russian Czar. Never trusting the Foreign Office, the Emperor preferred communication with his cousin "Nikki" to go through naval attaché Hintze. In 1905, Hintze joined the two emperors in a summit meeting in the Swedish city of Bjoerko. A year later, Hintze received the title "Flügeladjutant." The promotion, in a roundabout way, made him the direct representative of the German Emperor in Russia, a position that in many ways was more powerful than that of the ambassador. Hintze's close relationship with the two emperors and the circumvention of the Foreign Office by the Kaiser made him a long-term target of career diplomats in the Reich. In 1908, Wilhelm II made Hintze into a nobleman with the title of Baron that could be inherited. As such, the middle-class tobacco merchants of Schwedt became nobility. Von Hintze also received the promotion to rear admiral that year.

== Ambassador in Mexico ==
As the German ambassador to Mexico, Karl Buenz, left his post as the result of an illness, Emperor Wilhelm II was on the outlook for a fitting successor. The situation in Mexico had become critical as the result of the Mexican Revolution that had broken out in 1910. The choice fell on von Hintze, especially because of his military background. The new ambassador was dispatched not only to represent Germany to the new revolutionary government of Francisco León de la Barra, but also to provide important intelligence about the revolution. Von Hintze arrived in Veracruz on April 25, 1911. Members of von Hintze's clandestine network of agents in Mexico included Consul Otto Kueck, Felix A. Sommerfeld, and Carl Heynen. Sanctioned by the German government, von Hintze promoted German arms sales to Mexico. Many of the sales the German government contracted at that time with the Mexican government did not arrive in Mexico until Victoriano Huerta was dictator, prompting historians to allege German support for the dictator. He also relentlessly pursued the murderers of four German citizens in the city of Covadonga. As a result of von Hintze's efforts, the German government was the only one to receive payments for its murdered citizens from the revolutionary Mexican government. Von Hintze's efforts resulted in a restitution of 400,000 German Marks (about $95,000 at the time, $2 million in today's value) to Germany in June 1912. The perpetrators were tried and executed in the presence of the German ambassador in March 1913 (by then the Huerta government ruled Mexico). Von Hintze's relationship with the government of Francisco I. Madero was a productive one. Through his agent Felix Sommerfeld, who became Madero's secret service chief, the German ambassador kept up with political developments in the capital and the fight against uprisings along the Mexican–American border, most notably the revolt of Bernardo Reyes in the fall of 1911 and the uprising of Pascual Orozco in the spring of 1912.

In February 1913, however, the political unrest reached the capital of Mexico. In the Decena Tragica General Victoriano Huerta unseated President Madero and had him murdered. The German ambassador kept apprised of developments through his contacts with the other diplomats in the capital and through Felix Sommerfeld who stayed at the German embassy for most of the uprising. Von Hintze knew that a coup was about to happen. Rather than waiting for the military to make its move, the ambassador proposed for Madero to install Huerta as a successor, while he and his administration would retreat to safety. He pitched the idea first to Foreign Minister Pedro Lascuráin. Madero initially agreed but then relented. The coup happened and Madero was arrested. Von Hintze negotiated with American Ambassador Wilson as well as General Victoriano Huerta to secure the release and safe conduct of Madero and his family. He did not succeed. Despite General Huerta's assurances Madero and Pino Suárez were murdered.

Von Hintze returned to Germany for most of 1913 to recuperate from a flame up of amoebic dysentery. When he returned to Mexico in September 1913, President Huerta was waging a civil war against the revolutionary forces under the leadership of Venustiano Carranza. Von Hintze bluntly assessed the quality of the understaffed federal officer corps describing President Huerta as so desperate that he "...promotes waiters, accountants and such from one day to the next to lieutenants and captains -lawyers to generals...The Mexican army has plenty of generals...these are for the most part the type of people which are called ‘funeral generals’ in Russia, since their only activity is to parade in uniform for funeral processions – for money...one has to expect worse losses than Alviles Canon, Torreón and Durango, since now the generals who so-far remained in their salons are sent into the battlefield." Von Hintze correctly reported to Germany in the beginning of 1914 that Huerta was finished. Generals Pancho Villa and Alvaro Obregon were dealing Huerta one military blow after another in the field. The final nail in Huerta's coffin was the United States occupation of Veracruz on April 21, 1914. Von Hintze's role in the causes of the intervention is under dispute. The facts are that the German HAPAG ship SS Ypiranga (Ypiranga incident) had large amounts of arms and ammunition on board destined for the Huerta regime. American forces sought to prevent these weapons to land and occupied the harbor of Veracruz as a result. Ambassador von Hintze officially requisitioned the Ypiranga to serve the German navy as an auxiliary cruiser to carry German refugees. Whether the objective was to carry refugees in case of a war between the United States and Mexico or to force the delivery of the weapons to the Huerta regime, which is what actually happened, is unclear.

In July 1914, General Huerta gave up his fight against the Constitutionalists in the Mexican Revolution. On 20 July 1914 he departed from Puerto Mexico (now Coatzacoalcos) on the German cruiser SMS Dresden (1907), dutifully supplied by Ambassador von Hintze.

== Service in the World War ==
In July 1914, not only Huerta left Mexico. Ambassador von Hintze received his wartime assignment to China (1914–1917). He built up the German naval intelligence organization in the Far East and provided supplies for the East Asia Squadron under Admiral Maximilian von Spee. After his China assignment von Hintze served in Norway between 1917 and 1918. Despite his lack of political experience, von Hintze was appointed Foreign Minister on July 9, 1918, following the resignation of his predecessor, Richard von Kühlmann, who had fallen afoul of the military High Command, led by Field Marshal Paul von Hindenburg and General Erich Ludendorff, who effectively governed the country. During his time in the foreign ministry, Hintze pushed the Kaiser towards liberalization of the government and was involved in the discussions which led to the decision to seek an armistice at the end of September. After the resignation of the government of Chancellor Georg von Hertling on October 3, Hintze was replaced as Foreign Minister by Wilhelm Solf.

Diplomatic posts
Preceded by Radolf von Kardorff	German Ambassador to Mexico; 1911–1914	Succeeded by Heinrich von Eckardt
Preceded by Emil Krebs as Chargé d'Affaires	German Minister to China; 1914–1917	Relations severed owing to China's declaration of war
Preceded by Gustav Michahelles	German Ambassador to Norway; 1917–1918	Succeeded by Gerhard von Mutius
Political offices
Preceded by Richard von Kühlmann	Secretary of State for Foreign Affairs; July–October 1918	Succeeded by Wilhelm Solf
