= Presidium of the Reichstag =

Presidium of the Reichstag may refer to:

- Presidium of the Reichstag (German Empire) 1871–1903
- Presidium of the Reichstag (Weimar Republic) 1919–1933
- Presidium of the Reichstag (Third Reich) 1933–1945
