= Presidium of the Reichstag (German Empire) =

Presidium of the Reichstag (German Empire)

== First legislative session 1871-1874 ==
President
Dr. Eduard von Simson
First Deputy President
Chlodwig, Prince of Hohenlohe-Schillingsfürst
Second Deputy President
Franz von Weber

== Second legislative session 1874-1877 ==
President
Max von Forckenbeck
First Deputy President
Chlodwig, Prince of Hohenlohe-Schillingsfürst
Second Deputy President
Albert Hänel

== Third legislative session 1877-1878 ==
President
Max von Forckenbeck
First Deputy President
?
Second Deputy President
?

== Fourth legislative session 1878-1881 ==
President
Max von Forckenbeck
First Deputy President
Franz August Schenk von Stauffenberg
Second Deputy President
Hermann, Prince of Hohenlohe-Langenburg

== Fifth legislative session 1881-1884 ==
President
Albert von Levetzow
First Deputy President
Georg Arbogast von Franckenstein
Second Deputy President
Karl Gustav Ackermann

== Sixth legislative session 1884-1887 ==
President
Wilhelm von Wedell-Piesdorf
First Deputy President
Georg Arbogast von und zu Franckenstein
Second Deputy President
Adolph Hoffmann

== Seventh legislative session 1887-1890 ==
President
Wilhelm von Wedell-Piesdorf
First Deputy President
Franz Armand Bühl
Second Deputy President
Hans Wilhelm von Unruhe-Bomst

== Eighth legislative session 1890-1893 ==
President
Albert von Levetzow
First Deputy President
Franz von Ballestrem
Second Deputy President
Karl Baumbach

== Ninth legislative session 1893-1898 ==
President
Albert von Levetzow
First Deputy President
Rudolf von Buol-Berenberg
Second Deputy President
Albert Bürklin

== Tenth legislative session 1898-1903 ==
President
Franz von Ballestrem
First Deputy President
Arnold Woldemar von Frege-Weltzien
Second Deputy President
Reinard Schmidt

== See also ==
- Presidium of the Reichstag (Weimar Republic)
- Presidium of the Reichstag (Third Reich)
