= Presidium =

Type of governing body

A presidium or praesidium is a council of executive officers in some countries' political assemblies that collectively administers its business, either alongside an individual president or in place of one. In Romance-speaking countries such as Spain, France, and Italy, this council is typically called the bureau. The term is also sometimes used for the governing body of European non-state organisations.

== Collective Presidency ==
There are traditionally two models for the presidency of a parliamentary assembly, the collective presidency and individual speakership.

The institution of the presidium represents the collective presidency model, also known as the called the "continental European model" since it has been adopted by most parliament in continental Europe. Under this model, the presidium manages the house's work and the speaker only chairs the presidium. In addition the Speaker chairs the chamber and guarantees the opposition's rights but does not give up their political affiliation and may participate in debates.

In contrast, under the individual speakership model, of which the archetype is the Speaker at Westminster, the speaker is the sole guarantor of the chamber’s independence and privileges. In this model, supervising the House's work is performed by others (for example, in many British Commonwealth countries, the Leader of the House). The United States House of Representatives represents a variation of this model with the Speaker being also the leader of the majority in the chamber, in contrast to the Speaker of the British House of Commons who rejects all political affiliation.

== Communist usage ==
In Communist states the presidium is the permanent committee of the legislative body. The Presidium of the Supreme Soviet existed after 1936, when the Supreme Soviet of the USSR supplanted the Congress of Soviets of the USSR, as a replacement for the Central Executive Committee which was headed by "the Presidium of the Central Executive Committee". In its place was the Presidium of the Supreme Soviet alone, no Central Executive Committee, and from 1938 to 1989, the Chairman of the Presidium of the Supreme Soviet was the formal title of the head of state of the USSR until the office of Chairman of the Supreme Soviet was introduced in 1989, later to be replaced by the President of the Soviet Union in March 1990. The Republics of the Soviet Union were each led by Presidiums, such as the Presidium of the Supreme Soviet of the Russian Soviet Federative Socialist Republic and the Presidium of the Supreme Soviet of the Ukrainian Soviet Socialist Republic, whose chairmen were the de facto head of state in those republics.

From 1952 to 1966, the Politburo of the Communist Party of the Soviet Union was known as the Presidium of the Central Committee of the Communist Party, but despite the similarity in name with the Presidium of the Supreme Soviet, the two Presidia were very different in power and function.

The term presidium is currently used in the Democratic People's Republic of Korea (Presidium of the Politburo of the Workers' Party of Korea) and in the People's Republic of China (Presidium of the National People's Congress, Standing Committee of the National People's Congress; the Chinese word for presidium is 主席团 while standing committee is 常务委员会).

== Other usage ==
=== Asian countries ===
==== Bangladesh ====
In the Bangladeshi political party Awami League, the Presidium is the innermost or topmost circle of members who are of highest importance within the party.

=== European countries ===
==== Germany ====
In Germany, the Presidium of the Bundestag consists of a president, who traditionally represents the largest party group, and at least one vice president from each party group. It is responsible for the legislature's routine administration, nowadays including its clerical and research activities. The Bundesrat of Germany is also led by a Presidium, of a President and 2 deputies. Earlier German states also had parliaments led by Presidiums; see Presidium of the Reichstag (German Empire), Presidium of the Reichstag (Weimar Republic), Presidium of the Reichstag (Nazi Germany) and Presidium of the Volkskammer in East Germany.

==== Greece ====
The Hellenic Parliament in Greece is led by a Presidium composed of the Speaker, 7 deputies, 3 deans and 6 secretaries.

==== Netherlands ====
In the Netherlands the House of Representatives is led by the Speaker and a number of deputies, together forming its presidium.

==== Norway ====
The Parliament of Norway, the Storting, is led by a Presidium, consisting of a President and 5 vice-presidents.

==== Poland ====
In Poland, the Sejm is led by the Prezydium, made up of the Marshal and the Deputy Marshals of the Sejm. The Head of the Chancellery of the Sejm also attends the meetings of the Presidium in an advisory capacity. The Presidium of the Senate of the Republic of Poland is similarly made up of the Marshal and Deputy Marshals of the Senate. The Senate may elect no more than 4 Deputy Marshals, whilst in the Sejm the number of Deputy Marshals is determined at the pleasure of the house.

==== Sweden ====
The Swedish Riksdag is also led by a Presidium consisting of a Speaker and 3 deputies.

=== Non-state organisations ===
The Presidium of the Socialist International advises its president and prepares questions for consideration. In Flemish and Scandinavian student organisations, presidium is an umbrella term for all the chairmen in the organisations' administration.

A Presidium headed by a president, elected together quinquennially, governs the International Association of Wagner Societies.

== See also ==
- Office of the President (disambiguation)

== Bibliography ==
- Bergougnous, Georges (1997). Presiding Officers of National Parliamentary Assemblies. Geneva: Inter-Parliamentary Union. ISBN 92-9142-028-X.
