= List of presidents of the Reichstag =

President of the Reichstag
- Präsident des Reichstags

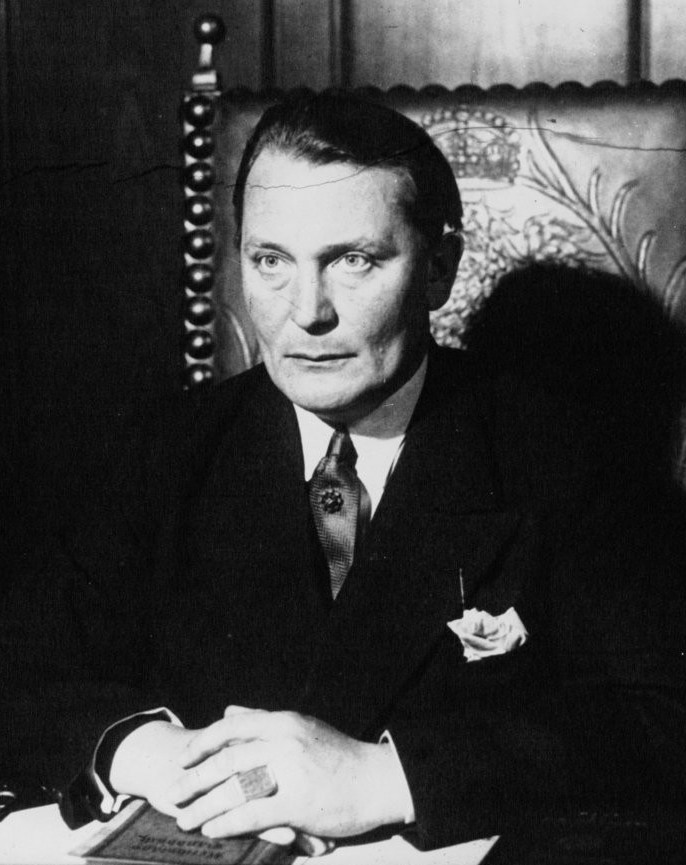
- Longest serving and last officeholder Hermann Göring; 30 August 1932 – 23 April 1945
- Presidium of the Reichstag
- Style: Mr. President
- Type: Presiding officer
- Seat: Reichstag building, Königsplatz, Berlin
- Nominator: Political parties
- Appointer: Reichstag traditionally appointing nominee of the largest party
- Term length: Contemporaneous to legislative period
- Constituting instrument: German Constitution
- Formation: March 1871
- First holder: Eduard von Simson
- Final holder: Hermann Göring
- Abolished: 23 April 1945
- Succession: President of the Bundestag, 1949; President of the Volkskammer, 1949

The president of the Reichstag (German: Präsident des Reichstags) was the presiding officer of the German legislature from 1871 to 1918, under the German Empire and again from 1920 to 1945, under the Weimar Republic and Nazi Germany.

== List of presidents ==
Political party: Independent NLP DKP DRP Zentrum FVP SPD DDP DNVP NSDAP

No.	Portrait	Name (Birth–Death)	Term of office		Time in office	Political party
No.	Portrait	Name (Birth–Death)	Took office	Left office	Time in office	Political party
Presidents of the Reichstag
1	Eduard von Simson	Eduard von Simson (1810–1899)	March 1871	February 1874	2 years, 11 months	Independent
2	Max von Forckenbeck	Max von Forckenbeck (1821–1892)	February 1874	May 1879	5 years, 3 months	NlP
3	Otto Theodor von Seydewitz [de]	Otto Theodor von Seydewitz (1818–1898)	May 1879	February 1880	9 months	DKP
4	Adolf von Arnim-Boitzenburg [de]	Adolf von Arnim-Boitzenburg (1832–1887)	February 1880	February 1881	1 year	DRP
5	Gustav von Goßler [de]	Gustav von Goßler (1838–1902)	February 1881	November 1881	9 months	DKP
6	Albert von Levetzow	Albert von Levetzow (1827–1903)	November 1881	November 1884	3 years	DKP
7	Wilhelm von Wedell-Piesdorf	Wilhelm von Wedell-Piesdorf (1837–1915)	November 1884	November 1888	4 years	DKP
(6)	Albert von Levetzow	Albert von Levetzow (1827–1903)	November 1888	March 1895	6 years, 4 months	DKP
8	Rudolf von Buol-Berenberg	Rudolf von Buol-Berenberg (1842–1902)	March 1895	December 1898	3 years, 9 months	Centre
9	Franz von Ballestrem	Franz von Ballestrem (1834–1910)	December 1898	20 February 1907	8 years, 2 months	Centre
10	Udo zu Stolberg-Wernigerode [de]	Udo zu Stolberg-Wernigerode (1840–1910)	20 February 1907	19 February 1910 †	2 years, 364 days	DKP
11	Hans von Schwerin-Löwitz	Hans von Schwerin-Löwitz (1847–1918)	1 March 1910	7 February 1912	1 year, 343 days	DKP
12	Johannes Kaempf	Johannes Kaempf (1842–1918)	7 February 1912	25 May 1918 †	6 years, 107 days	FVp
13	Constantin Fehrenbach	Constantin Fehrenbach (1852–1926)	June 1918	9 November 1918	5 months	Centre
Presidents of the Weimar National Assembly
1	Eduard David	Eduard David (1863–1930)	7 February 1919	13 February 1919	6 days	SPD
–	Conrad Haußmann	Conrad Haußmann (1857–1922); Acting	13 February 1919	14 February 1919	1 day	DDP
2	Constantin Fehrenbach	Constantin Fehrenbach (1852–1926)	14 February 1919	21 June 1920	1 year, 128 days	Centre
Presidents of the Reichstag
14	Paul Löbe	Paul Löbe (1875–1967)	25 June 1920	28 May 1924	3 years, 338 days	SPD
15	Max Wallraf	Max Wallraf (1859–1941)	28 May 1924	7 January 1925	224 days	DNVP
(14)	Paul Löbe	Paul Löbe (1875–1967)	7 January 1925	30 August 1932	7 years, 236 days	SPD
16	Hermann Göring	Hermann Göring (1893–1946)	30 August 1932	23 April 1945	12 years, 236 days	NSDAP

== See also ==
- Reichstag (North German Confederation)
- Reichstag (German Empire)
- Reichstag (Weimar Republic)
- Reichstag (Nazi Germany)

== Sources ==
- German ministries 1871–1945 – Rulers.org
