= Constantin Fehrenbach =

Chancellor of Germany from 1920 to 1921

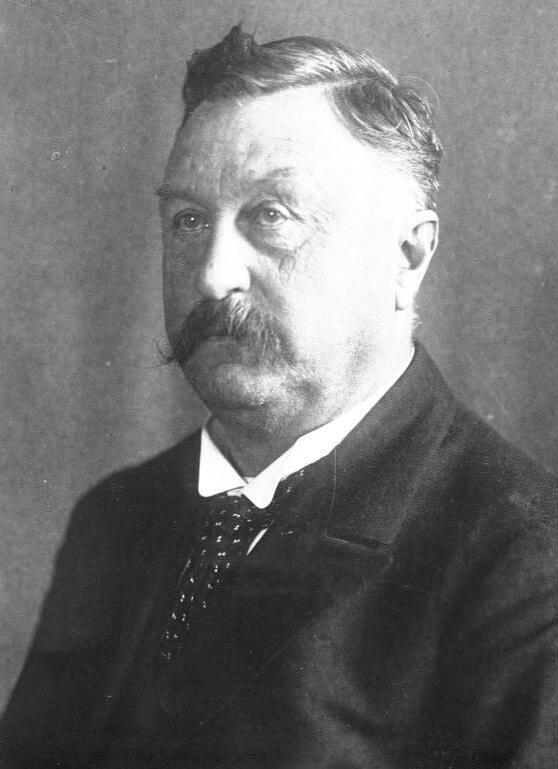
- Fehrenbach in 1913

Chancellor of Germany (Weimar Republic)
- In office 25 June 1920 – 10 May 1921
- President: Friedrich Ebert
- Deputy: Rudolf Heinze
- Preceded by: Hermann Müller
- Succeeded by: Joseph Wirth

President of the Weimar National Assembly / President of the Reichstag
- In office 14 February 1919 – 21 June 1920
- President: Friedrich Ebert
- Chancellor: Philipp Scheidemann
- Preceded by: Conrad Haußmann (acting); Eduard David
- Succeeded by: Paul Löbe (as President of the Reichstag)
- In office June 1918 – November 1918
- Monarch: Wilhelm II
- Chancellor: Georg von Hertling; Prince Maximilian of Baden
- Preceded by: Johannes Kaempf
- Succeeded by: Eduard David (as President of the Weimar National Assembly)

Member of the Reichstag
- In office 24 June 1920 – 26 March 1926
- Constituency: Baden

Member of the Weimar National Assembly
- In office 6 February 1919 – 21 May 1920
- Constituency: Baden

Personal details
- Born: 11 January 1852 Wellendingen, Kingdom of Württemberg
- Died: 26 March 1926 (aged 74) Freiburg im Breisgau, Germany
- Party: Centre Party

Constantin Fehrenbach, sometimes erroneously Konstantin Fehrenbach, (11 January 1852 – 26 March 1926), was a German politician who was one of the major leaders of the Catholic Centre Party. He served as president of the Reichstag in 1918 and then as president of the Weimar National Assembly from 1919 to 1920. In June 1920, Fehrenbach became Chancellor of Germany. During his time in office, the central issue he had to face was German compliance with the terms of the Treaty of Versailles. He resigned in May 1921 when his cabinet was unable to reach a consensus on war reparations payments to the Allies. Fehrenbach remained in the Reichstag and headed the Centre Party's contingent there from 1923 until his death in 1926.

Fehrenbach was considered part of the Centre Party's left wing, which included noted politicians such as Matthias Erzberger and Joseph Wirth, as well as Catholic workers' associations and Catholic trade unions.

== Early life ==
Constantin Fehrenbach was born on 11 January 1852 in Wellendingen near Bonndorf in what was then the Grand Duchy of Baden as the son of Johann Georg Fehrenbach, a teacher (1826–1895), and his wife Rosina (1832–1900), née Gensecke.

From 1865, he attended the Freiburg Boys' Seminary and the Berthold Gymnasium, from which he graduated in 1871. He began studying Catholic theology at the University of Freiburg before switching to law in 1875. During his studies, he joined a student fraternity that gave him access to circles of notables among the local bourgeoisie. In 1882, he began to practise law in Freiburg and soon became a successful criminal lawyer. In 1879, Fehrenbach married Maria (1855–1921), née Hossner, at Freiburg. They had one daughter.

== Political career ==
=== German Empire ===
Fehrenbach started his political career in 1884 when he became a member of the Freiburg city council for the Catholic Centre Party. The next year, he was elected to the Landtag (state legislature) of Baden, again for the Centre Party. He resigned his seat in 1887 after disagreements with the leader of the party in Baden, Theodor Wacker, over the dismantling of Otto von Bismarck's anti-Catholic Kulturkampf laws. In 1895, Fehrenbach became Stadtrat (member of the city government) in Freiburg and in 1896 Kreisabgeordneter (district representative). In 1901, he was re-elected to the Baden Landtag and remained a member until 1913 (in 1907–1909 as president).

In 1903, Fehrenbach also became a member of the Imperial Reichstag. On 3 December 1913, he gained fame throughout Germany with a speech on the Zabern Affair, which had been triggered by popular unrest against the German military stationed in the Alsatian town of Zabern. He spoke out against the Army General Staff and delivered a strong plea in favour of a constitutional state and against the military as a state within the state.

In 1917, Fehrenbach became the chairman of the Hauptausschuss (Head Committee) of the Reichstag, which could meet when the Reichstag was adjourned and have discussions with the government on matters of foreign policy and the conduct of the war. He supported the Reichstag Peace Resolution, which called for a negotiated peace without annexations. In July 1918, Fehrenbach became the last President of the Imperial Reichstag.

=== Revolution and Weimar National Assembly ===
During the early days of the German Revolution of 1918–1919, Fehrenbach, a committed supporter of a constitutional monarchy, wanted to convene the Imperial Reichstag in order to preserve the monarchy, but the move was opposed by the revolutionary interim government, the Council of the People's Deputies.

Fehrenbach was elected to the Weimar National Assembly on 19 January 1919 in Germany's first election that gave women the right to vote. When the Assembly convened on 6 February to draft and adopt a constitution for Germany and to act as its interim parliament, Fehrenbach was elected its vice president, but since three of the highest offices were in the hands of the Social Democratic Party (SPD), the Centre Party objected. The Assembly's president then stepped down, and Fehrenbach was elected in his place.

As President of the National Assembly, Fehrenbach had to face the difficult issue of whether Germany should accept the Treaty of Versailles. In a speech to the Reichstag on 12 May, he said, to enthusiastic agreement: "We had hoped for a peace of an international alliance, of an international understanding. This is not an opening to such a peace; it is the perpetuation of war." The Assembly reluctantly approved the Treaty, and, also under Fehrenbach, debated and approved the Weimar Constitution.

=== Chancellorship ===
The 1920 Reichstag election led to the collapse of the Weimar coalition made up of the SPD, the German Democratic Party (DDP) and the Centre Party, which had formed the governments during the National Assembly. The SPD lost a significant share of the vote to its left-wing rival party, the Independent Social Democrats (USPD), leading to the formation of a middle-class minority cabinet consisting of the Centre, DDP and centre-right German People's Party (DVP). After some hesitation, Fehrenbach accepted the offer to become Chancellor. With only 168 of 469 seats (36%) in the Reichstag behind his government, it was from the beginning in a weak position to handle the difficulties it faced.

As Chancellor, Fehrenbach had to deal with the communist-led revolt known as the March Action, which was put down with considerable loss of life by government troops, and with the Third Silesian Uprising of Polish insurgents. In social policy, his government improved unemployment benefits, with the maximum amount for single males over the age of 21 increasing in November 1920 from 7 to 10 marks.

The most important task of his chancellorship was the fulfilment of the terms of the Treaty of Versailles. Fehrenbach led the German delegation at the Spa conference from 5 to 16 July 1920, where German disarmament and reparations were discussed. The total amount and the terms of reparations payments were also the subject of the conferences at Paris and London during the early months of 1921. At the first London Conference in March, Fehrenbach and his foreign minister Walter Simons protested against what they saw as the exorbitantly high total reparations payments, which had not been finalized in the Versailles Treaty. In order to put pressure on Germany to accept the reparations terms, the Entente on 5 May issued the London ultimatum, which threatened an Allied occupation of the Ruhr if Germany did not comply with the London Schedule of Payments and the Treaty of Versailles' requirements for disarmament and the extradition of German "war criminals".

Before the ultimatum was issued, the American government had declined Germany's request to act as mediator in the reparations dispute, which left Germany with few viable options. Rumors of an ultimatum had reached Fehrenbach's cabinet a few days before 5 May, and since the DVP had already announced that it would no longer support the government's foreign policy, the cabinet resigned on 4 May. Fehrenbach remained in charge of the caretaker government until his replacement by Joseph Wirth of the Centre Party on 10 May.

== Post-chancellorship ==
In 1922, Fehrenbach became a judge on the State Court for the German Reich (Staatsgerichtshof). In late 1923, Fehrenbach was elected head of the Centre Party contingent in the Reichstag, a position in which he remained until his death in 1926.

Following the assassination of Foreign Minister Walther Rathenau, who was Jewish, by the ultra-nationalist paramilitary Organisation Consul on 24 June 1922, Fehrenbach became vice-chairman of the Association for Defence against Antisemitism (Verein zur Abwehr des Antisemitismus). He also supported the founding in 1924 of the Reichsbanner Schwarz-Rot-Gold, an unarmed, militarily structured joint organisation of the SDP, DDP and Centre Party whose stated purpose was the non-violent protection of the republic from its enemies.

Fehrenbach died on 26 March 1926 in Freiburg im Breisgau.

Political offices
Preceded by Hermann Müller	Chancellor of Germany; 25 June 1920 – 4 May 1921	Succeeded by Joseph Wirth
