= Conrad Haußmann =

German politician (1857–1922)

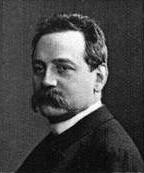

Member of the Weimar Reichstag/Weimar National Assembly
- In office 1919–1922
- 1919–1920: Weimar National Assembly

Acting President of the Weimar National Assembly
- In office 13 February 1919 - 14 February 1919
- President: Friedrich Ebert
- Chancellor: Philipp Scheidemann
- Preceded by: Eduard David
- Succeeded by: Constantin Fehrenbach

Member of the Reichstag
- In office 1890–1918
- Constituency: Württemberg 9

Personal details
- Born: 8 February 1857 Stuttgart, Kingdom of Württemberg
- Died: 11 February 1922 (aged 65) Stuttgart, Weimar Republic
- Party: German People's Party; Progressive People's Party; German Democratic Party
- Spouse: Helene Kausler
- Children: Robert; Wolfgang

Conrad Haußmann – or "Haussmann" in English spelling – (8 February 1857 – 11 February 1922) was a liberal German politician during the German Empire and the early years of the Weimar Republic. He was a member of the state parliament of Württemberg from 1889 and of the national Reichstag from 1890 until his death in 1922. Following World War I, he was one of the founders of the German Democratic Party (DDP).

== Family ==
Born on 8 February 1857 in Stuttgart, Conrad Haußmann came from a family that was active in democratic politics in the Kingdom of Württemberg. His father, Julius Haußmann, was involved in the German Revolution of 1848; his mother, Marie Stoffel, was Swiss. His twin brother Friedrich became a member of the German Reichstag. Haußmann married Helene Kausler in 1887 and, with her, had two sons. The eldest, Robert, worked as a lawyer in Stuttgart and was president of the local bar association. Wolfgang Haußmann (1903–1989) was minister of justice in Baden-Württemberg from 1953 to 1966.

== Education and professional life ==
After graduating from the Eberhard-Ludwigs-Gymnasium in Stuttgart, Haußmann studied law in Zürich, Munich, Berlin and Tübingen and settled as a lawyer in Stuttgart in 1883. In 1907 he took part with the writers Hermann Hesse, with whom he was friends, and Ludwig Thoma in the founding of the political-literary magazine März ("March"), which was initially published by Albert Langen. It was intended as a "constructive counterpart" to Langen's satirical magazine Simplicissimus. Haußmann, who was committed to Franco-German reconciliation following the 1870–1871 Franco-Prussian War, provided the writer Anatole France and Jean Jaurès, a leading French social democrat, with the opportunity to contribute to März.

== Political activity ==
=== Party affiliations ===
In his youth, Haußmann joined the German People's Party, which after 1910 was the Württemberg branch of the Progressive People's Party. Along with his brother and Friedrich von Payer, he formed the party's leadership beginning in 1885. Under their direction, the German People's Party became the strongest force in the 1895 Württemberg state election, with 32.5% of the vote.

After the World War I, he was one of the co-founders of the German Democratic Party (DDP) and was instrumental in the Württemberg Democrats joining the DDP as a state association.

=== Parliamentary deputy ===
From 1889 until his death, Haußmann was a member of the state parliament in Württemberg. Until 1918, he was in the second chamber of the Estates of Württemberg, then from 1919 in the state parliament of the Free People's State of Württemberg. As a member of the Democratic People's Party, he campaigned for constitutional reform.

From 1890 to 1918, Haußmann was a member of the Reichstag for the electoral district of Württemberg 9 (Balingen, Rottweil, Spaichingen, Tuttlingen). As a Reichstag deputy, he worked with Eugen Richter and the German Free-minded Party because the German People's Party had been unable to achieve significant parliamentary strength in the Reichstag. In the course of the Daily Telegraph Affair that followed Emperor Wilhelm II's indiscreet comments in an article published in the British newspaper, Haußmann became known to the general public through his call for the chancellor to be responsible to the Reichstag rather than the emperor. After the merger of his party with the German Free-minded Party and the Free-minded Union to form the Progressive People's Party, he increasingly assumed a leading role in the liberal movement of the German Empire.

Prior to the outbreak of World War I, he made intensive efforts to establish contacts with French deputies at meetings in Bern and in Basel in order to reduce tensions. In July 1917, he was one of the initiators of a resolution in the Reichstag calling for a negotiated peace to end the war. On 14 October 1918, Haußmann was appointed state secretary without portfolio in the cabinet of Max von Baden, where he was responsible for drafting Chancellor Baden's statements. With the transition to the first post-monarchical government, Haußmann gave up his post, although the new chancellor, Friedrich Ebert, would have liked to include him in his cabinet. At the state level, he assumed the chairmanship of the newly founded German Democratic Party (DDP) at the end of 1918.

In early 1919, Haußmann was elected as a DDP delegate to the Weimar National Assembly, the body that drafted a new constitution for Germany and acted as its interim parliament. He served as vice president of its Presidium and chaired the "Committee for the Preliminary Consultation of the Draft Constitution of the German Reich". In 1920, Haußmann failed to be elected president of the People's State of Württemberg. He withdrew from state politics but was a member of the Weimar Reichstag until his death on 11 February 1922.
