= Reichstag (German Empire) =

Former legislative body (1871–1918)

German Reichstag Deutscher Reichstag
- Legislative body of Germany

History
- Established: 18 January 1871
- Disbanded: 26 October 1918
- Preceded by: North German Reichstag
- Succeeded by: Weimar National Assembly
- Seats: 397 (at dissolution)

Elections
- Voting system: Two-round system with universal male suffrage
- First election: 3 March 1871
- Last election: 12 January 1912

Meeting place
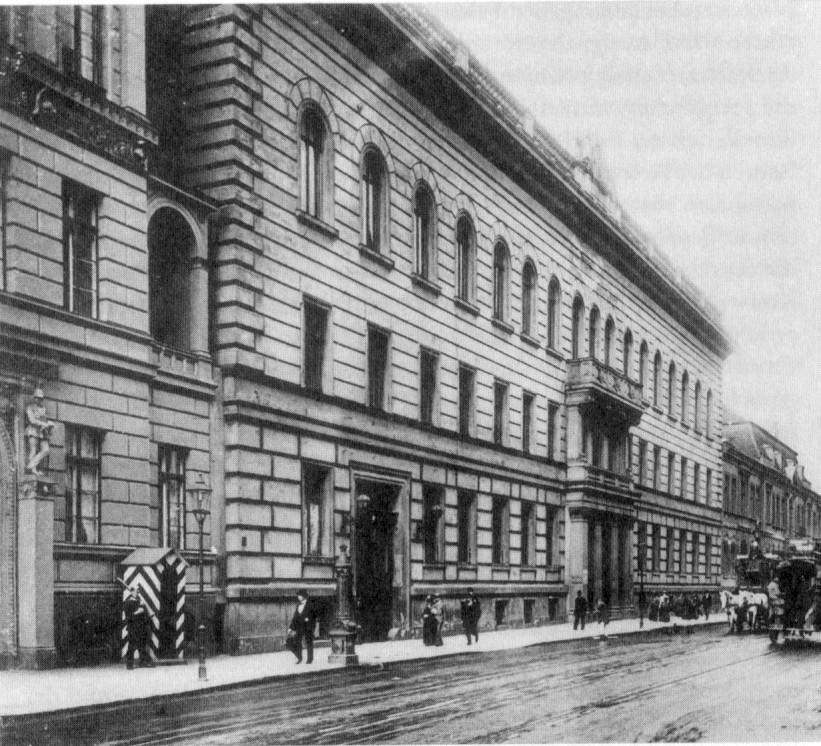
- Leipziger Straße 4, Berlin (1871–1894)

Constitution
- Constitution of the German Empire

The Reichstag (German: [ˈʁaɪçstaːk], "Diet of the Realm"), of the German Empire was Germany's parliament from 1871 to 1918. Within the governmental structure of the Reich, it represented the national and democratic element alongside the federalism of the Bundesrat and the monarchic and bureaucratic element of the executive, embodied in the Reich chancellor. Together with the Bundesrat, the Reichstag had legislative power and shared in decision-making on the budget. It also had certain rights of control over the executive branch and could engage the public through its debates. The emperor had little political power, and over time the position of the Reichstag strengthened with respect to both the imperial government and the Bundesrat.

Reichstag members were elected for three-year terms from 1871 to 1888 and following that for five years. It had one of the most progressive electoral laws of its time: with only a few restrictions, all male citizens 25 and older were allowed to vote, secretly and equally, in direct elections. The Reichstag met throughout the First World War, but was prevented from sitting during the German Revolution of 1918–1919. Its last session took place on 26 October 1918. Its successors were the Weimar National Assembly (February 1919 to June 1920), followed by the Reichstag of the Weimar Republic that met for the first time in June of 1920.

== Electoral franchise ==
The 1871 Constitution of the German Empire did not change the legal form of the parliament as it had been laid down for the Reichstag of the North German Confederation in its 1867 constitution.

Members were elected by universal, equal and secret manhood suffrage, with the voting age set at 25. The suffrage was quite extensive both in comparison to other countries and to the various German state parliaments. In most countries at that time, votes were not equal but weighted by such factors as class or income (census suffrage). Prussia, for example, the largest state in the Empire, used a three-class franchise in elections to the Prussian House of Representatives, with votes weighted by the amount of tax paid.

Since it was thought that allowing men in active military service to vote would politicize the military, they were denied the franchise, although they had the right to stand for election. Also ineligible to vote were men dependent on public assistance for the poor, those over whose assets bankruptcy or insolvency proceedings had been initiated, and those who had been declared incapacitated or been deprived of their civil rights by a court judgment. In the 1912 Reichstag elections, 22.2% of the population (14.442 million men) were eligible to vote; by comparison the figures were 16% in Great Britain and 28% in the United States. The percentage eligible to vote in Reichstag elections was also significantly higher than in German state elections, such as in Prussia, Bavaria and Saxony, where the right to vote was subject to additional conditions.

=== Runoff elections ===
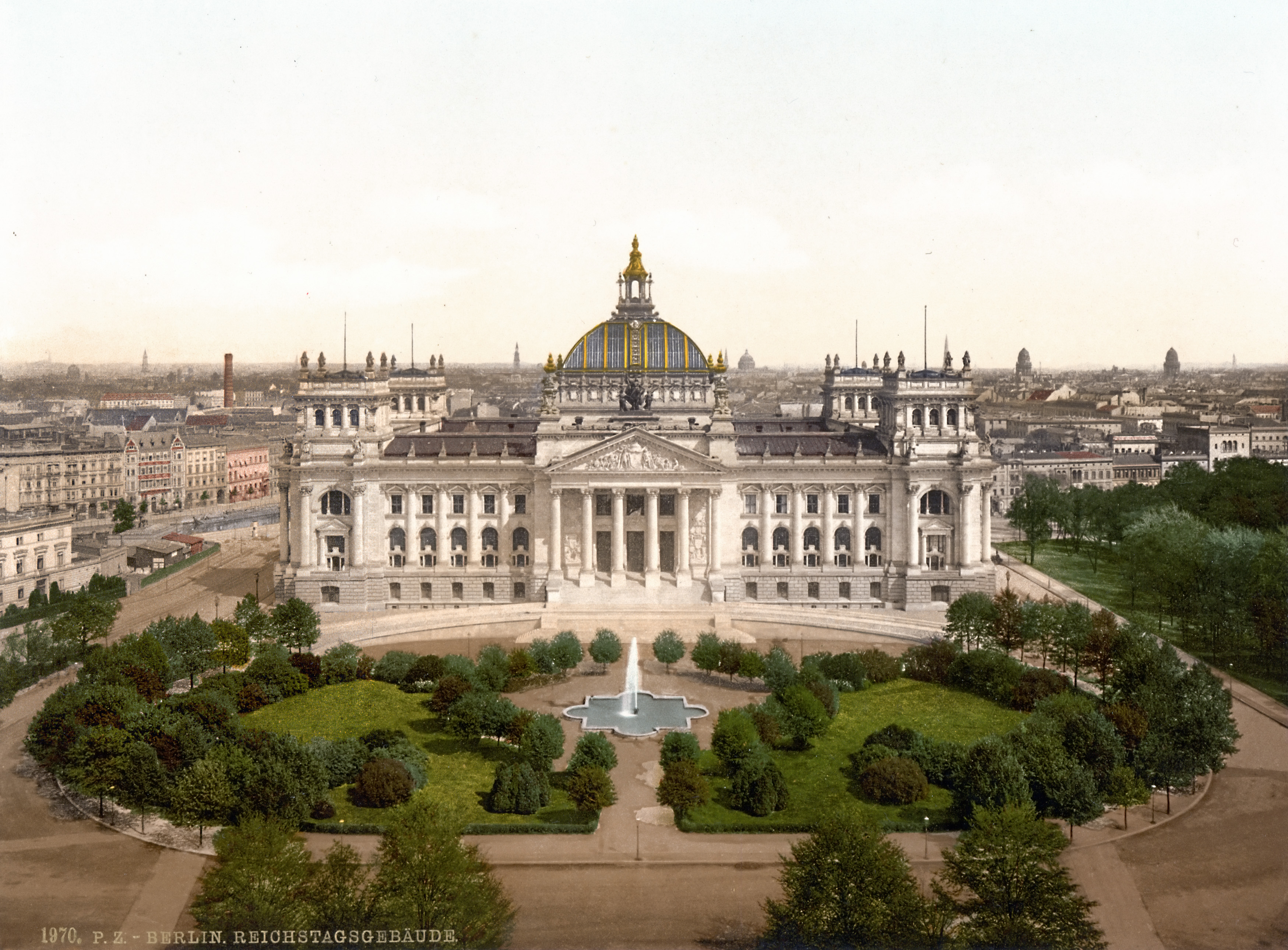
The Reichstag's new building as of 1894

Elections were held in districts that elected a single member by absolute majority, which meant that – unlike under the proportional representation of the Weimar Republic and the Federal Republic of Germany – there were only directly elected deputies. If no candidate received an absolute majority in the first round, a runoff election was held between the two candidates with the highest number of votes. Runoff elections became increasingly important during the life of the Empire. Whereas in the 1874 Reichstag election, runoffs had to be held in 46 of the 397 electoral districts (11.6%), in the 1890 election there were 147 (37%) and 190 in 1912 (47.9%).

=== Consequences of electoral district boundaries ===
In 1871 the Reichstag consisted of 382 deputies. After the addition of fifteen electoral districts to Alsace–Lorraine in 1874, there were 397 until the end of the Empire in 1918. The electoral districts were initially drawn to include about 100,000 people each, with the exception of eight small states that formed their own electoral districts even though they had fewer than 100,000 inhabitants. Since the electoral district boundaries were based on the borders of the individual German states, some electoral districts consisted of widely separated areas. The fragmentation was particularly pronounced in the Thuringian states.

Reichstag electoral districts in 1907

Due to differing rates of population growth caused primarily by internal migration to the big cities and industrial centers, large differences arose in the populations of the individual electoral districts. In 1912 there were twelve electoral districts with fewer than 75,000 inhabitants and twelve with more than 400,000, the largest of which, electoral district 10 in Potsdam, had 1,282,000. The layout of the electoral districts, which was based on the 1864 census and did not change afterwards, disadvantaged those political parties that had their constituencies primarily in the cities. The small electoral districts that coincided with individual "dwarf" states continued to send one deputy to the Reichstag because the federal structure of the Reich required that each state have a seat regardless of population, as was notably the case in Schaumburg-Lippe, with a population of about 45,000 in 1912.

An 1869 electoral law stipulated that it was parliament and not a statutory order by the administration that adjusted electoral boundaries to reflect population changes. The Reichstag was suspicious of the administration because it had regularly manipulated district boundaries in Prussian state elections. But in the following decades, the Bundesrat, as a part of parliament, prevented a legislative adjustment of electoral districts.

== Composition and function ==
Reichstag seats by state
State	Seats
Prussia	236
Bavaria	48
Saxony	23
Württemberg	17
Baden	14
Thuringian states	12
Hesse	9
Mecklenburg	6
Hansa Cities	5
Oldenburg	3
Brunswick	3
Small states	6
Alsace–Lorraine	15
Total	397

=== Deputies ===
Deputies were considered representatives of the entire German people and under the constitution were not bound by instructions. They enjoyed immunity from prosecution on the basis of their office and security against loss or other financial burden (indemnity), as well as protection from disciplinary sanctions resulting from their political actions as parliamentarians.

Strong emphasis was placed on the separation between the executive and parliament. A deputy who was appointed Reich chancellor or a state secretary (minister) subordinate to him, or to a state government, had to resign his seat in the Reichstag.

No allowances were paid because there were to be no professional politicians. In practice this meant that deputies had to have the time available and be able to afford the office financially. Candidates who were not wealthy or civil servants were thus at a disadvantage. Lawyers and journalists, for example, were able to combine being a member of parliament with their profession. Max Weber also counted Prussian Junkers, industrialists, pensioners and high officials among the group. The majority of businessmen, on the other hand, were rarely free because of the demands of their occupation. This was even more true for workers.

Financial compensation could come through support from a member's party or an interest group. The Social Democratic Party (SPD) paid its deputies a kind of salary from 1876 on. Numerous parliamentarians were also employed as party functionaries or journalists for the party press. In 1898 about 40% of Social Democratic deputies were party employees and another 15–20% were employed by the socialist free trade unions. In the conservative camp, the German Agrarian League (Bund der Landwirte) supported Reichstag members financially and expected political support in return. Industrial associations and the Catholic Church acted similarly. A government-funded expense allowance was made available in 1906, but the 3,000 marks per year was too little to live on. The makeup of the Reichstag showed that these types of financial provisions could not prevent something like professional political class from developing.

=== Convening and dissolution ===
The proceedings of the Reichstag were public (Article 22 of the Reich Constitution), and the press reported widely on the debates. The electoral period was three years until 1888, then five. The Reichstag had no right of self-assembly but was convened annually by the emperor, an act that proved to be a formality.

The Bundesrat was allowed to dissolve the Reichstag with the emperor's consent. New elections had to be held within sixty days, and the newly elected Reichstag had to be convened after 90 days at the latest. The Reichstag was dissolved only four times: in 1878, 1887, 1893, and 1906. The initiative always came from the chancellor, who hoped that the Reichstag parties supporting him would gain seats. Such an outcome was uncertain, which was a main factor behind the low number of Reichstag dissolutions.

=== Rules of procedure and the president ===
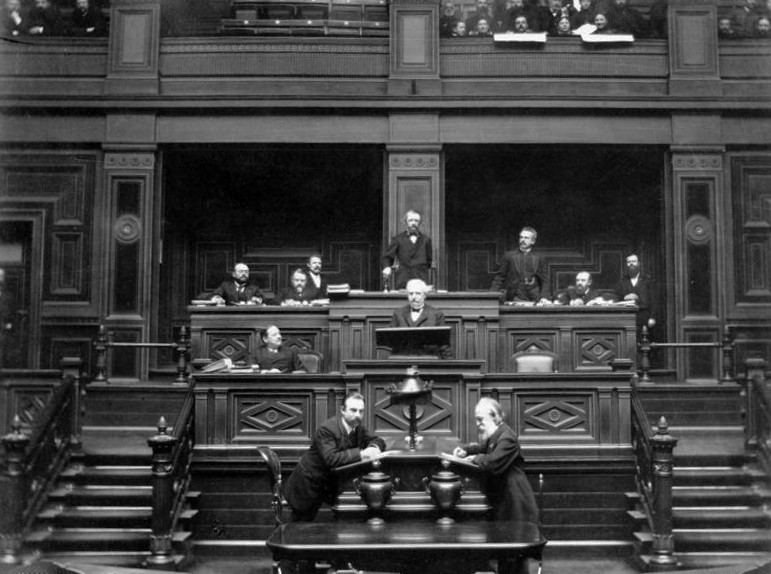
Speaker's platform, presidium and stenographers

The Reichstag based its internal organization on the rules of procedure of the Prussian House of Representatives. They remained in force until 1922, after the end of the Empire.

The expansion of parliamentary committees was halting. The number of members depended on the strength of the parliamentary parties. In the council of elders (Seniorenkonvent), generally made up of members of the parties' leadership, agreement was reached on committee chairmanships. Unlike the rules of procedure for the Reichstag of the Weimar Republic, there was no specification of the numbers or tasks of committees.

Reichstag members elected a president and his deputies. The president represented the parliament externally and had the task of maintaining internal order. He set the agenda, and members could reject it only by a majority vote. The president could call speakers to order, request that they be deprived of the floor if they disobeyed, or exclude them from the session. It was inadmissible to enter into a debate about the emperor. If a member dared to do so, the president intervened.

The members of the Bundesrat enjoyed a special position in parliament. They were not subject to the presidential power of order and had the right to be heard. The chancellor as such did not have the right to speak, but in practice he was almost always a member of the Bundesrat.

=== Political parties and the council of elders ===
Parliamentary parties were not mentioned in parliamentary rules, but they de facto played a decisive role. They chose members of the presidium that was responsible for routine administrative activities and decided on speakers and the composition of committees.

The parliamentary groups in the Empire were generally associations of deputies from the same party. The parties elected an executive committee, usually from the respective party leadership. They financed themselves through contributions from members. Regular meetings were held to discuss parliamentary procedure.

There was no compulsion to belong to a parliamentary party. The threat of exclusion was nevertheless an important means of internal discipline. Abstaining from a vote was often the option for members in disagreement. Party discipline became more and more prevalent as time went on. Discipline was weakest in the middle-class parties in which individual voting behavior was for a long time not uncommon.

The council of elders operated outside the official rules of procedure. As the governing body of the Reichstag, leading representatives of the parties came together to vote on such matters as the agenda, committee appointments and procedural issues. The decisions of the council of elders were not subject to the majority principle, but were made unanimously. From around 1890, parties were represented in the body according to their strength.

If the Reichstag president did not come from a strong party, he had to follow the council to a greater extent than if he came from a strong one. Until 1884 members of the presidium were not members of the council of elders. After that, the first vice president was also head of the council. In 1899 the president assumed the function himself.

== Duties and rights ==
=== Legislation and budget ===
Under Article 23 of the constitution, one of the Reichstag's central rights was that it could propose bills (its legislative initiative) and that a bill could become law only with its consent. The Reichstag shared both rights with the Bundesrat (Article 16). Even though no law could be enforced against the will of the state governments represented in the Bundesrat, the latter's importance in everyday constitutional life gradually diminished.

On the first reading of a bill, only a general debate on the principles of the draft was to take place. Not until the second reading were the individual articles allowed to be debated. At that point amendments could also be proposed. In the third reading, there was to be a synthesis of the results from the first and second readings. Newly proposed motions had to have the support of at least thirty deputies. Finally, the entire draft was put to a vote.

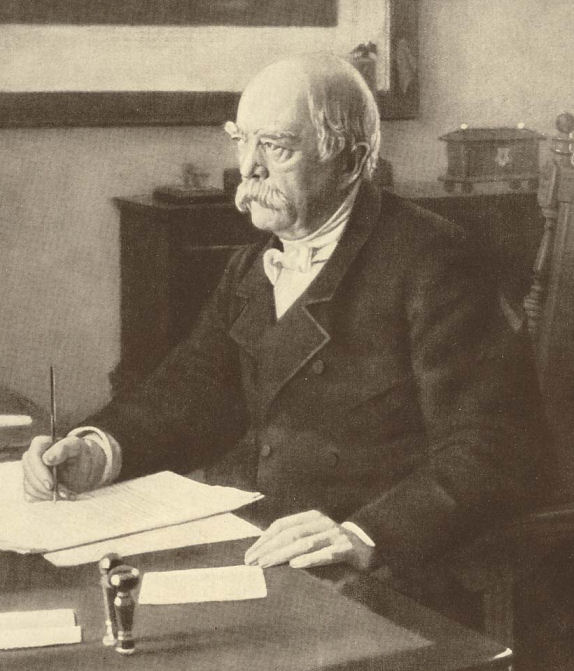
Otto von Bismarck

The Reichstag's core responsibility was its budgetary authority and thus the decision on the Reich's budget in the form of a law (Article 69). Otto von Bismarck, who was Chancellor from 1871 to 1890, had proposed a budget covering three years, but the Reichstag enforced a period of one year. If unbudgeted expenditures occurred, a supplementary budget had to be passed. The Reichstag did not vote on the total amount as Bismarck had originally envisaged; instead the expenditures were broken down in detail, and the Reichstag could discuss each item separately. In this context, the discussion of the budget became the central debate on the government's actions as a whole.

Military budgets were set for a period of seven years, dropping later to five. It was very difficult to reduce the military budget, and even attempts to influence individual items met with problems. In the years between the adoption of a new military budget, parliament had no say in what was by far the Reich's largest area of expenditure.

There were also limits to parliamentary influence over revenue. Indirect taxes and customs duties were fixed for a longer period than the budget, which limited parliament's leeway, and contributions from the states were outside the Reichstag's competence. Parliament could reject new revenues, but it could not impose them on its own. Article 70 of the constitution stated that additional revenues "shall be raised, as long as no taxes of the Empire shall have been established, by assessing the several States of the Empire according to their population, the amount of the assessment to be fixed by the chancellor of the Empire in accordance with the budget agreed upon."

Also in the area of foreign policy, parliament's rights of participation were limited. Only in customs, trade, transport and similar areas was approval of international treaties required (Articles 4 and 11). In the making of alliances, agreements did not even need to be made known to parliament. Declarations of war or peace were a matter for the emperor. He needed the consent of the Bundesrat but not the Reichstag.

=== Control of the executive ===
For any area of government action, the Reichstag had the right of petition or interpellation (interruption of the order of the day by demanding an explanation from a minister). An interpellation required the consent of 30 deputies. The chancellor was not obliged to appear in the Reichstag or to answer questions. In practice, however, chancellors did so in order to justify their positions.

Control of the executive was further developed in the committees. A minor reform of the Reichstag's rules of procedure in 1912 introduced the right of each deputy to put a minor question to the Reich chancellor. The question was answered without subsequent debate. Furthermore, the right of interpellation was extended by allowing the question under discussion to be put to a vote. Under the constitution, the Reichstag had no direct influence on the appointment or dismissal of the chancellor, which was a matter for the emperor. In practice, however, no policy could be implemented in the long term against the will of the Reichstag because it had to pass the laws by a majority vote and approve the budget. The chancellor therefore needed the Reichstag's political support even if he did not have to resign in the event of a vote of no confidence.

=== Position in the power structure ===
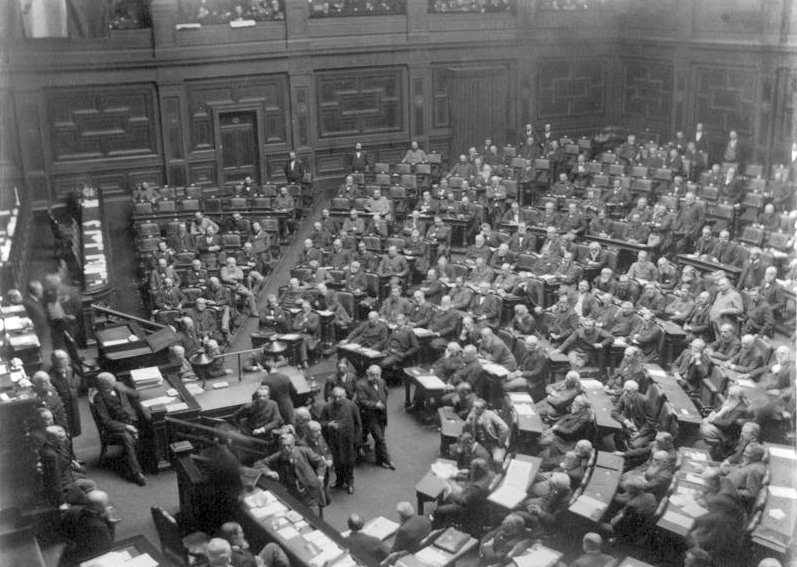
The Reichstag in session, 1889

Although the chancellor was not accountable to parliament, he still depended on parliament's approval for laws and the budget. The newly formed Reich needed additional laws, and the increasingly complex economy and society led to a further need for legal regulations. By at times voting down major proposals supported by both the government and the emperor, the Reichstag showed its growing importance in the law-making process.

Universal manhood suffrage (one of the most liberal voting rights of its time) resulted in large-scale political mobilization. Voter turnout rose from 51% in 1871 to 85% in 1912. Parties and interest groups of all kinds formulated their interests and effectively brought them to bear in parliament. The Reichstag thus also held a key position in the Reich's institutionalized decision-making structure.

The Reichstag's position with respect to the government depended on its internal political makeup. The German multi-party system made it difficult to form parliamentary majorities. Bismarck played the parties against each other, relying on shifting majorities or compliant coalitions. After the turn to a more conservative Reichstag in 1878–79, the parties often confined themselves to either reacting to or obstructing government measures. The parties' limited willingness to compromise among themselves made it easier for the government to achieve its goals. It resorted if necessary to dissolving the Reichstag, the possibility of which always played a background role for parliamentary decisions.

After the Bismarck era, the threat of dissolution became less and less important. The fact that fixed political electoral camps were forming played a role in the change. There were few non-voters left for the government to win over. With the exception of the 1907 election, new elections no longer brought any changes that would have improved the government's position. On the other hand, the contrast between the political camps continued to intensify, making joint action against the government more difficult.

== End of the Empire ==
In October 1918, with the prospect of imminent defeat in World War I and in the hope of obtaining more favorable peace terms from the Allies, parliament enacted constitutional reforms that required the Reichstag's approval for declaring war and making peace and that made the chancellor dependent on the confidence of the Reichstag rather than the emperor. But the reforms were not enough for either the Allies or the people of Germany, and in the German Revolution of 1918–1919, brought an end to the Reichstag of the German Empire.

== Elections ==
Reichstag elections were held in the following years:

- 1871
- 1874
- 1877
- 1878
- 1881
- 1884
- 1887
- 1890
- 1893
- 1898
- 1903
- 1907
- 1912

== List of presidents ==
Presidents of the Reichstag (1871–1918)
No.	Name	Start of Term	End of Term
1	Eduard Simson	1871	1874
2	Maximilian Franz August von Forckenbeck	1874	1879
3	Otto von Seydewitz	1879	1880
4	Adolf Graf von Arnim-Boitzenburg	1880	1881
5	Gustav Konrad Heinrich von Goßler	1881	1881
6	Albert Erdmann Karl Gerhard von Levetzow	1881	1884
7	Wilhelm von Wedell-Piesdorf	1884	1888
8	Albert Erdmann Karl Gerhard von Levetzow	1888	1895
9	Rudolf Freiherr von Buol-Berenberg	1895	1898
10	Franz von Ballestrem	1898	1907
11	Udo Graf zu Stolberg-Wernigerode	1907	1910
12	Hans Graf von Schwerin-Löwitz	1910	1912
13	Johannes Kaempf	1912	1918
14	Constantin Fehrenbach	1918	1918

== Notable members ==
- Franz von Ballestrem (Centre Party)
- Ludwig Bamberger (National Liberal Party, German Free-minded Party)
- Theodor Barth (National Liberal Party, German Free-minded Party)
- Ernst Bassermann (National Liberal Party)
- August Bebel (Socialist Workers' Party, later Social Democratic Party)
- Rudolf von Bennigsen (National Liberal Party)
- Eduard Bernstein (Social Democratic Party)
- Eduard Georg von Bethusy-Huc (Free Conservative Party)
- Albert Hänel (German Progress Party, German Free-minded Party)
- Wilhelm Hasenclever (General German Workers' Association, Socialist Workers' Party)
- Otto von Helldorff (German Conservative Party)
- Ernst von Heydebrand und der Lasa (German Conservative Party)
- Wojciech Korfanty (National-Democratic Party (Poland))
- Karl Liebknecht (Social Democratic Party)
- Wilhelm Liebknecht (Socialist Workers' Party, later Social Democratic Party)
- Ludwig Löwe (German Progress Party, German Free-minded Party)
- Otto von Manteuffel (German Conservative Party)
- Hermann von Mallinckrodt (Centre Party)
- Helmuth Karl Bernhard von Moltke (German Conservative Party)
- Theodor Mommsen (German Progress Party, National Liberal Party)
- Friedrich von Payer (German Peoples' Party)
- Viktor I, Duke of Ratibor (Free Conservative Party)
- August Reichensperger (Centre Party)
- Peter Reichensperger (Centre Party)
- Eugen Richter (German Progress Party, German Free-minded Party, Free-minded Peoples' Party)
- Burghard von Schorlemer-Alst (Centre Party)
- Hermann Schulze-Delitzsch (German Progress Party, German Free-minded Party)
- Rudolf Virchow (German Progress Party, German Free-minded Party, Free-minded Peoples' Party)
- Heinrich von Treitschke (National Liberal Party)
- Ludwig Windthorst (Centre Party)
