= Rudolf von Buol-Berenberg =

German lawyer and politician

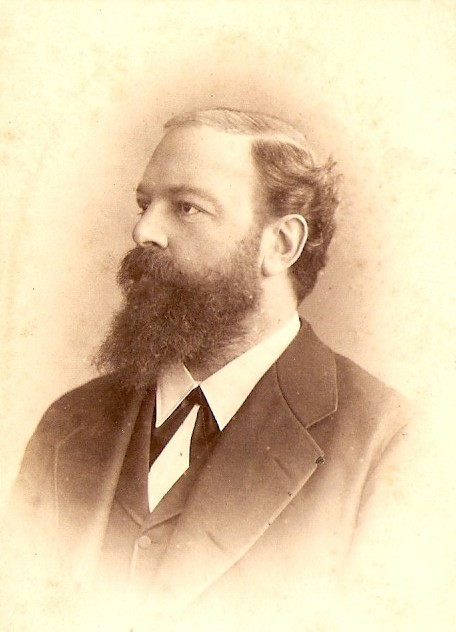

President of the Reichstag
- In office March 1895 – December 1898
- Preceded by: Albert von Levetzow
- Succeeded by: Franz von Ballestrem

Personal details
- Born: 24 May 1842 Zizenhausen, Grand Duchy of Baden
- Died: 4 July 1902 (aged 60) Baden-Baden, Grand Duchy of Baden
- Spouse: Elisabeth von Savigny (m. 1883; died 1902)
- Children: 1
- Parent(s): Bertha Baader; Rudolf Johann von Buol-Berenberg

Rudolf, Freiherr von Buol-Berenberg (24 May 1842 – 4 July 1902) was a German lawyer and politician of the Centre Party who served as President of the Reichstag from 1895 to 1898.

== Early life ==
Buol-Berenberg was born on 24 May 1842 in Zizenhausen near Stockach in the Grand Duchy of Baden. He was the fourth of six children born to Bertha Baader and Baron Rudolf Johann von Buol-Berenberg (1809–1895), Lord of the Mühlingen estate and owner of Zizenhausen Castle.

Rudolf attended high school in Konstanz before studying law in Munich at the Universities of Freiburg and Heidelberg. In the same year he became a member of the Corps Rhenania Freiburg and Franconia Munich.

== Career ==
In 1864, Buol-Berenberg became a legal intern at the Konstanz district court and, in 1866, a trainee assessor at the Konstanz District Court. In 1870, he became a district judge in Mannheim. In 1879, he was appointed regional judge in Mannheim before becoming a higher regional judge in Karlsruhe in 1898.

Baron von Buol-Berenberg was a member of the 2nd Baden Chamber from 1881 to 1897, and from 1891 to 1894 as well as its 1st Vice President. He was a member of the Reichstag from 1884 to 1898 and President of the Reichstag between 1895 and 1898. As president, he invited Wilhelm Röntgen to present his experiments which produced and detected electromagnetic radiation in a wavelength range (known as X-rays or Röntgen rays) to the Reichstag and Bundestag in Berlin.

In 1890, he served as president of the 37th German Catholic Convention in Koblenz.

== Personal life ==
On 27 June 1883, Buol married Elisabeth von Savigny (1856–1902), a daughter of Karl Friedrich von Savigny, a Prussian diplomat who was a co-founder of the Centre Party, and Countess Marie von Arnim-Boitzenburg (a daughter of Count Adolf Heinrich von Arnim-Boitzenburg, the 1st Minister President of Prussia). They were the parents of a daughter, Mariefreda, who was born in 1886, who became a Novice in the Order of the Sacred Heart of Jesus in Vienna.

Baron von Buol-Berenberg's wife died five months before his death on 4 July 1902 in Baden-Baden. His funeral service was held in Baden-Baden before he was buried in the von Buol family burial ground at the parish church of St. Martin in Mühlingen.
