= Max Wallraf =

German politician (1859–1941)

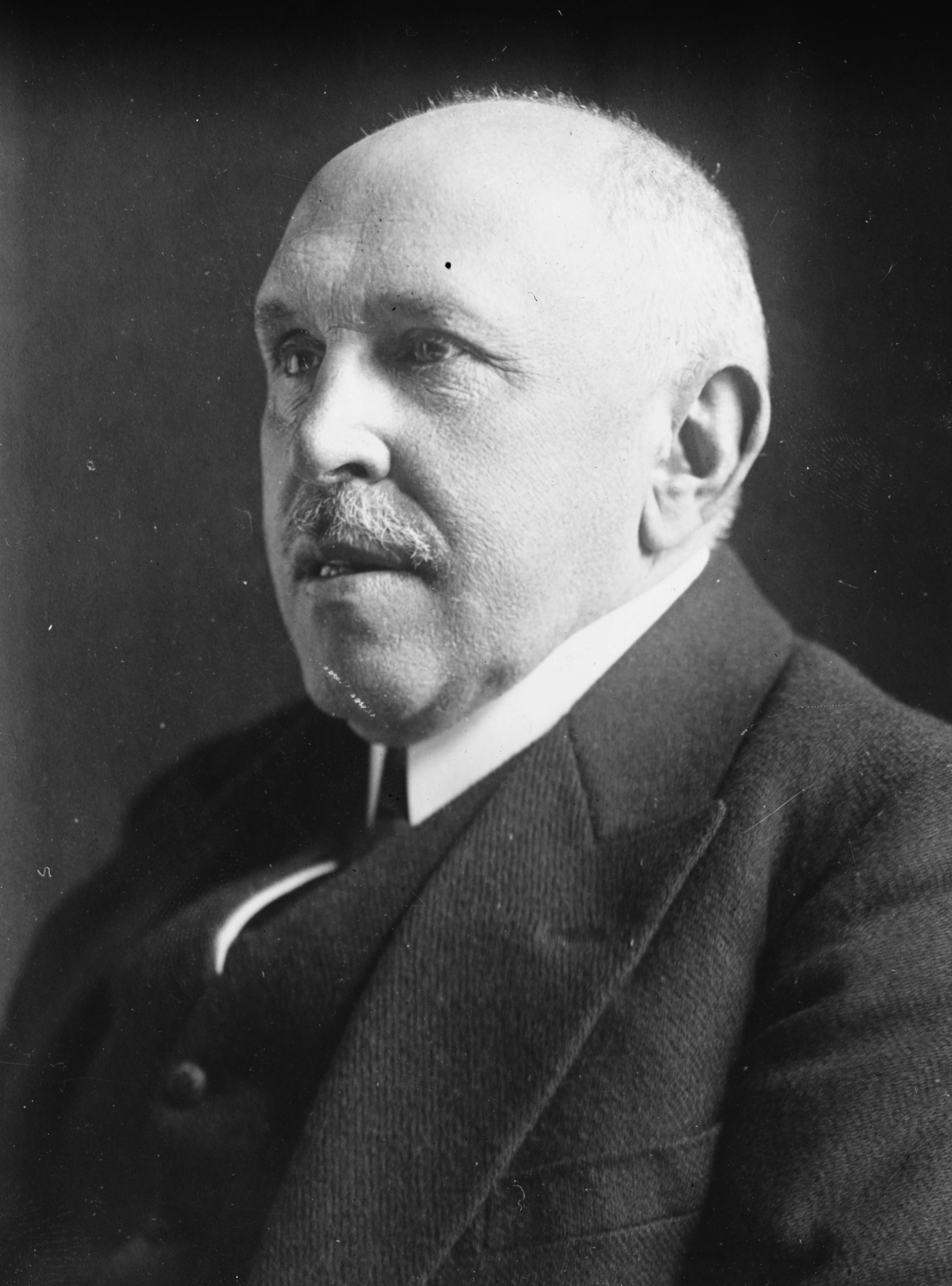
- Max Wallraf, 1924

President of the Reichstag
- In office 28 May 1924 – 7 January 1925
- Preceded by: Paul Löbe
- Succeeded by: Paul Löbe

Member of the Reichstag
- In office 1924–1930
- Constituency: Cologne–Aachen

Mayor of Cologne
- In office 1 October 1907 – 8 August 1917
- Deputy: Konrad Adenauer
- Preceded by: Friedrich Wilhelm von Becker
- Succeeded by: Konrad Adenauer

Personal details
- Born: Ludwig Theodor Ferdinand Max Wallraf; 18 September 1859 Cologne, Kingdom of Prussia
- Died: 6 September 1941 (aged 81) Oberstdorf, Germany
- Party: German National People's Party (until 1933); Nazi Party (from 1933)
- Occupation: Lawyer; Politician

Ludwig Theodor Ferdinand Max Wallraf (18 September 1859 – 6 September 1941) was a German politician who served as mayor of Cologne from 1907 to 1917. He was State Minister of the Interior from 1917 to 1918. As a German National People's Party politician, he was a member of the Reichstag from 1924 to 1930 and briefly served as its President in 1924/1925.

== Early life and education ==
Wallraf was born in Cologne. His parents were the lawyer and legal administrator Reiner Ludwig Wallraf (died 1877) and Wilhelmine Wallraf, née Berghaus (died 1906). He obtained his Abitur at the Apostelgymnasium in 1878, and studied law at the universities of Bonn, Heidelberg and Leipzig from 1878 to 1881. He became a trainee at the Oberlandesgericht Köln court in Cologne in 1881. In 1885, he was sent to the Regierungsbezirk Oppeln (now Opole) in Upper Silesia. He passed his state examination in Berlin in December 1886.

== Administrative and political career ==
Wallraf served as a Landrat (supreme district administrator) in the Prussian administration from 1888 to 1898, first for the district of Malmedy, then for the district of Sankt Goar. After serving in the provincial administration of the Rhine Province in Koblenz, he became head of the police in Aachen, where he served from 1900 to 1903.

On 13 July 1907, after lengthy negotiations involving his father-in-law Joseph Pauli, Wallraf was unanimously elected mayor of Cologne, as a Catholic following two Protestant mayors and as a compromise candidate who was acceptable to all factions. As mayor of Cologne, he was also a member of the Prussian House of Lords. He resigned in August 1917 when he was offered the position of state secretary (similar to a minister in other parliamentary systems) in the Ministry of the Interior and was replaced as mayor by Konrad Adenauer, who had worked as his deputy before and who was married to Wallraf's niece Emma Weyer. As State Secretary of the Interior in the cabinet of Reich Chancellor Georg von Hertling, Wallraf supported the suppression of the German strike of January 1918. In addition to his tenure as interior minister (23 October 1917 – 6 October 1918), Wallraf was minister without portfolio in the state government of Prussia from 7 January to 4 October 1918.

From 1921 to 1924, Wallraf was a member of the Landtag of Prussia and from 1924 to 1930 of the Reichstag, representing the national-conservative German National People's Party (DNVP).

Wallraf was elected President of the Reichstag on 28 May 1924, after the May 1924 German federal election, as the DNVP together with the Agricultural League was the largest parliamentary group. He was replaced by his predecessor Paul Löbe on 7 January 1925 after the December 1924 German federal election. During 1924, Wallraf was among those DNVP members who did not oppose the Dawes Plan, which caused a bitter dispute within the DNVP.

Wallraf became a member of the Nazi Party on 1 May 1933.

== Personal life ==
Wallraf was married twice. His first marriage was in 1889 to Emma Kesselkaul (22 July 1868 – 29 October 1892), the daughter of a merchant. Their son Max Wallraf (1891–1972) also studied law and became an administrator. In 1897, Wallraf got married for a second time, to Anna Pauli (1871–1932), the daughter of landowner and president of the Rhineland Agricultural Society, Joseph Pauli. They had two sons.

He died in Oberstdorf in 1941. A street in the Cologne district of Lindenthal is named after him.

== Bibliography ==
- Adenauer, Konrad (2008). "Wallraf, Max". Kölner Personen-Lexikon. By Soénius, Ulrich S. (in German). p. 562. ISBN 978-3-7743-0400-0. OCLC 198924220.
- Bailey, Stephen (1980). "The Berlin Strike of January 1918". Central European History. 13 (2): 158–174. doi:10.1017/S0008938900009080. ISSN 0008-9389. JSTOR 4545893. S2CID 145384448.
- Beck, Hermann (2008). The Fateful Alliance: German Conservatives and Nazis in 1933: the Machtergreifung in a New Light. Berghahn Books. ISBN 978-1-84545-496-8.
- Bundesarchiv (2007). "Kurzbiographien der Personen in den "Akten der Reichskanzlei, Weimarer Republik"". bundesarchiv.de (in German).
- Deutscher Reichstag (1924). Verhandlungen des Deutschen Reichstags. Vol. 381. Berlin: Reichsdruckerei.
- Deutscher Reichstag (1925). Verhandlungen des Deutschen Reichstags. Vol. 384. Berlin: Reichsdruckerei.
- Lange, Helmut (1991). "Ludwig Theodor Ferdinand Max Wallraf (1859–1941)". Persönlichkeiten der Verwaltung: Biographien zur deutschen Verwaltungsgeschichte 1648–1945. By Jeserich, Kurt G. A.; Neuhaus, Helmut (in German). W. Kohlhammer. pp. 276–280. ISBN 978-3-17-010718-2.
- Lilla, Joachim (2017). "Die Vertretung rheinischer Städte im Preußischen Herrenhaus 1854-1918". rheinische-geschichte.lvr.de (in German).
- Prittie, Terence (1979). The Velvet chancellors : a history of post-war Germany. New York: Holmes & Meier. ISBN 978-0-584-10461-5.
- Romeyk, Horst (1994). Publikationen der Gesellschaft für Rheinische Geschichtskunde (in German). Vol. 69. Droste. pp. 799–800. ISBN 978-3-7700-7585-0.
- Schäfke, Werner (5 October 2020). Kölns Weg in die Gegenwart: Vom Ende des Kaiserreichs bis ins 21. Jahrhundert (in German). Vandenhoeck & Ruprecht. ISBN 978-3-412-51695-6.
- Williams, Charles (21 June 2001). Adenauer: The Father of the New Germany. John Wiley & Sons. ISBN 978-0-471-43767-3.
- Ziblatt, Daniel (17 April 2017). Conservative Political Parties and the Birth of Modern Democracy in Europe. Cambridge University Press. ISBN 978-1-107-00162-6.

Political offices
Preceded by Wilhelm von Becker	Mayor of Cologne; 1907–1917	Succeeded by Konrad Adenauer
Preceded by Karl Helfferich	Reich Minister for Interior; 1917–1918	Succeeded by Karl Trimborn
Preceded by Paul Löbe	President of the Reichstag; 1924–1925	Succeeded by Paul Löbe
