= Emil Georg von Stauss =

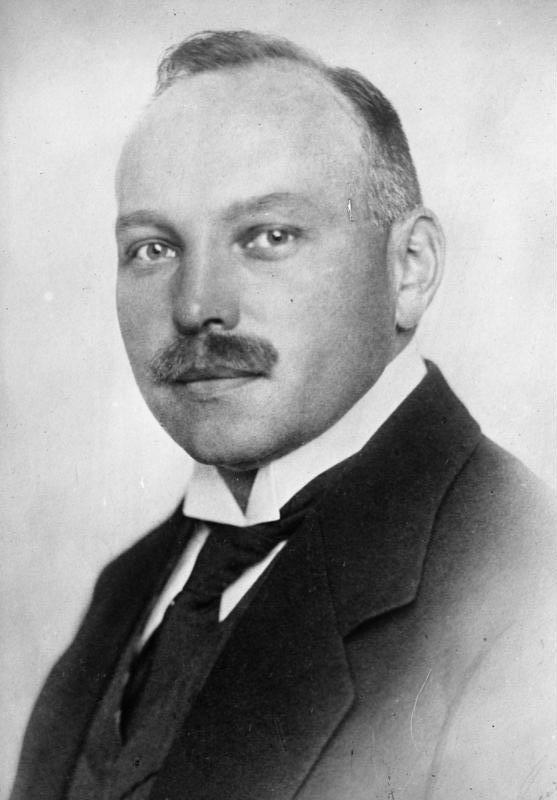
- von Stauss in 1929
- Born: October 6, 1877; Friedrichstal, Kingdom of Württemberg
- Died: December 11, 1942 (aged 65); Berlin, Germany
- Education: Eberhard-Ludwigs-Gymnasium

Emil Georg von Stauss (often rendered Emil Georg von Stauß, 6 October 1877 in Baiersbronn – 11 December 1942 in Berlin) was a German banker and business executive who served as Director-General of the board of the Deutsche Bank. Originally a member of the conservative German People's Party, he became a supporter of Adolf Hitler's Nazi Party. He was a close friend of Hermann Göring and helped to finance the Nazis rise to power. Stauss held a seat in the Reichstag and several other posts between 1933 and his death.

== Business career ==
As well as his banking interests von Stauss was also noted for his expertise in the petroleum industry, serving on the board of Deutsche Petroleum from 1920. He became a member of the board at Daimler-Motoren-Gesellschaft in 1925. He would continue his role at Daimler-Benz, eventually serving as chairman of the board. In 1926 he also became chairman of BMW.

== Politics ==
A close friend of Hjalmar Schacht, von Stauss had been cultivating close links to the Nazi Party since 1930. As well as holding several meetings with Adolf Hitler he also knew Hermann Göring well and provided him with significant funding during the Nazi rise to power. Personally closer to Göring, he introduced the Nazi leader to a number of leading business figures at dinner parties, contacts that helped to ensure the smooth transfer of power to the Nazis and avoid the possibility of any opposition from business leaders fearing any socialist aspect to Nazism.

Despite this von Stauss was a high-profile member of the German People's Party (DVP) and was elected as a deputy to the Reichstag from the party's electoral list in three elections between September 1930 and November 1932. He had been encouraged to retain his DVP membership by Göring, who felt he was more useful in that party, and tried to push the DVP more towards a pro-Nazi Party line in the run up to the Nazi takeover. With the dissolution of the DVP in June 1933, he was elected to the Reichstag again in November 1933 from electoral constituency 35, Mecklenburg. He served as Third Vice-President of the body. He was, however, one of the few members never to take up formal membership in the Nazi Party, sitting as a "guest" of the Nazi faction. On 15 September 1933, Göring appointed him to the recently reconstituted Prussian State Council. He also was made an inaugural member of Hans Frank's Academy for German Law on 2 October 1933, and a senator of the Kaiser Wilhelm Society in 1935. He retained all these posts until his death in December 1942.
