= Pławniowice =

- Village
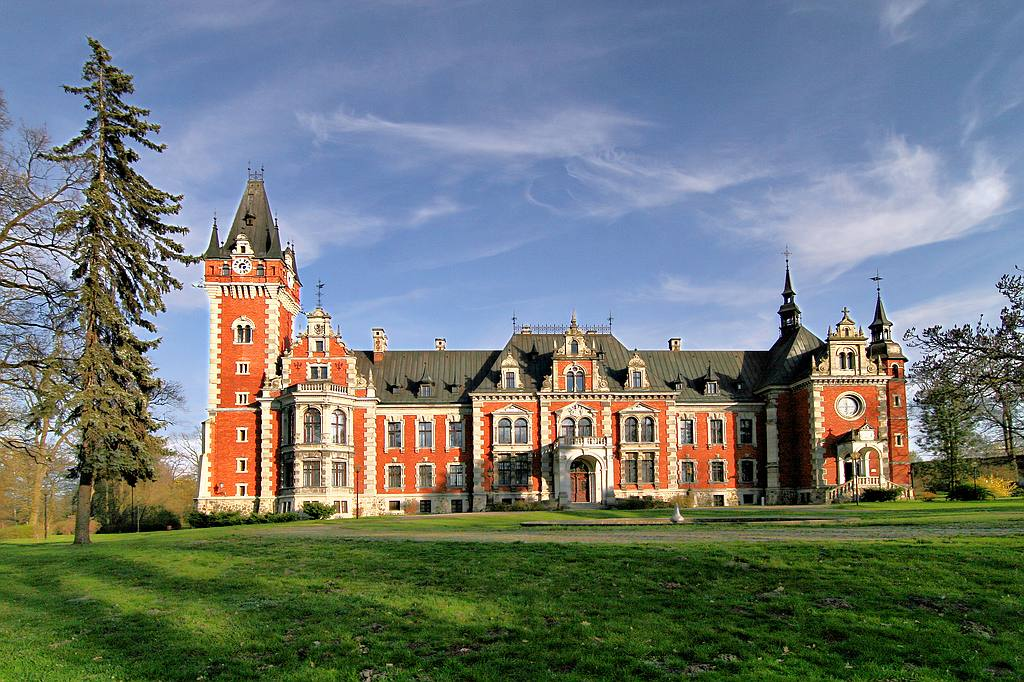
- Palace (built 1882-1884)

- Location within Poland
- Coordinates: 50°23′N 18°28′E
- Country: Poland
- Voivodeship: Silesian
- County: Gliwice
- Gmina: Rudziniec
- First mentioned: 1317
- Population: 824
- Time zone: UTC+1 (CET)
  - Summer (DST): UTC+2 (CEST)
- Vehicle registration: SGL

Pławniowice [pwavɲɔˈvit͡sɛ] is a village in the administrative district of Gmina Rudziniec, within Gliwice County, Silesian Voivodeship, in southern Poland.

== History ==
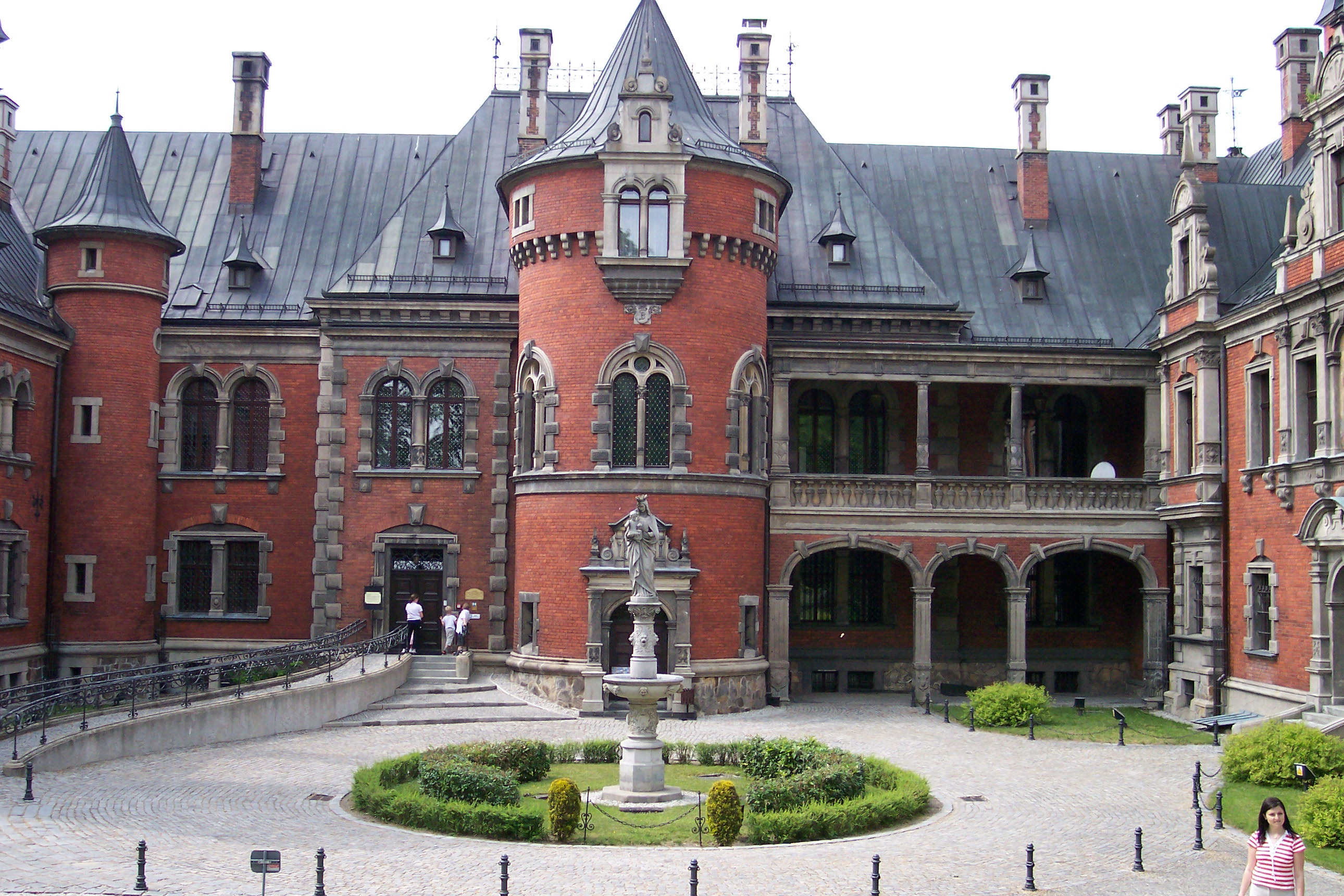
Palace courtyard

The village was first mentioned in 1317, when it was part of fragmented Piast-ruled Poland. Later on, it fell under the rule of the Bohemian Crown, thus becoming part of the Holy Roman Empire. The local manor was initially owned by local knights and then was part of a large fee tail estate which changed ownership numerous times. In the 16th century it became part of the Habsburg monarchy. In 1645, along with the Duchy of Opole, Pławniowice returned to Polish rule under the House of Vasa, and in 1666 it fell back to Habsburg-ruled Bohemia. The area was mostly a scenic woodland next to a large lake until 1737, when it was bought by a nobleman called Franz Wolfgang von Stechow. Following the Silesian Wars, the village was annexed by Prussia. In 1789 it passed through a marriage to the wealthy noble clan of the Ballestrems, who built a fairy tale palace between 1882 and 1884. Designed by Constantine Heidenreich, the palace is a three-wing structure in the architectural style of Dutch neo-mannerism. It is known for its "contrast in colour and texture between the red brick walls and ornamental stone edging". The roofs are adorned by various turrets, towers, dormers and needles of different shapes and sizes. Moreover, the palatial site is also adjacent to a carefully planned landscape park alongside a water canal. In 1861, the village had a population of 1,041.

In 1871, the village became part of the German Empire. In the 1921 Upper Silesia plebiscite, 66.2% of the residents voted to rejoin Poland, which just regained independence following World War I, however the village remained within Germany in the interbellum. In 1936, during a massive Nazi campaign of renaming of placenames, the village was renamed to Flößingen to erase traces of Polish origin. During World War II, the Germans operated the E218 forced labour subcamp of the Stalag VIII-B/344 prisoner-of-war camp at the local forestry.

The palace remained in the hands of the Ballestrems until the end of World War II when it was abandoned as the Red Army quickly approached the village. The palace was then looted and the lavish interiors were devastated. After the defeat of Germany in the war, in 1945, the village became again part of Poland and its historic Polish name Pławniowice was restored.

Following the war, the palace was owned by the Polish state and was neglected, which contributed to its deteriorated over time. Since 1993 it has undergone full renovation and is now a local tourist attraction.

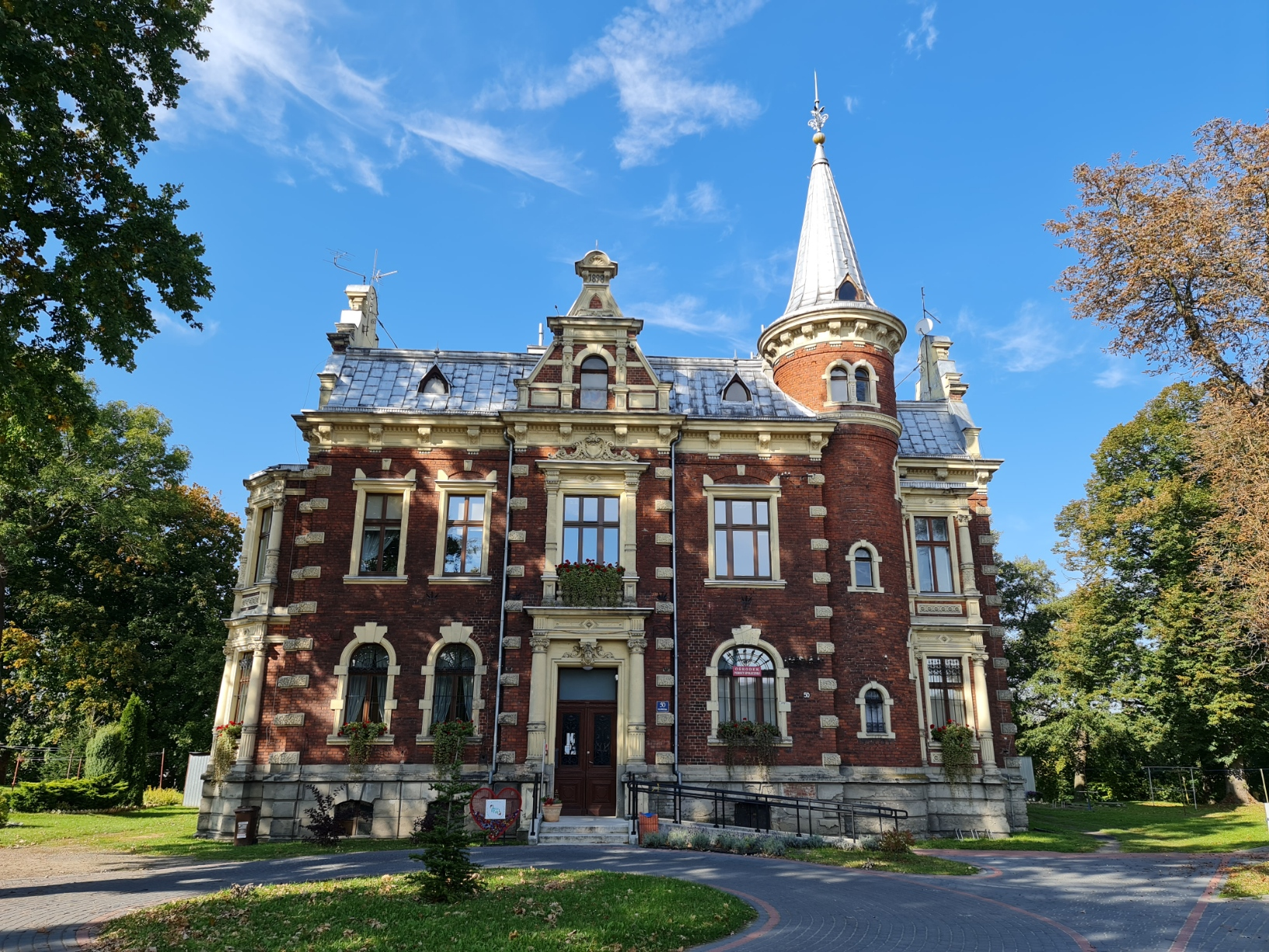
Social Welfare Centre

== Transport ==
The Polish A4 motorway passes through the village, and its intersection with the National road 40 is located just outside of the village.

== Sports ==
The local football club is Olimpia Pławniowice. It competes in the lower leagues.

== People ==
- Franz von Ballestrem (1834–1910), German politician, speaker of German Reichstag
