= Paul Löbe =

German politician

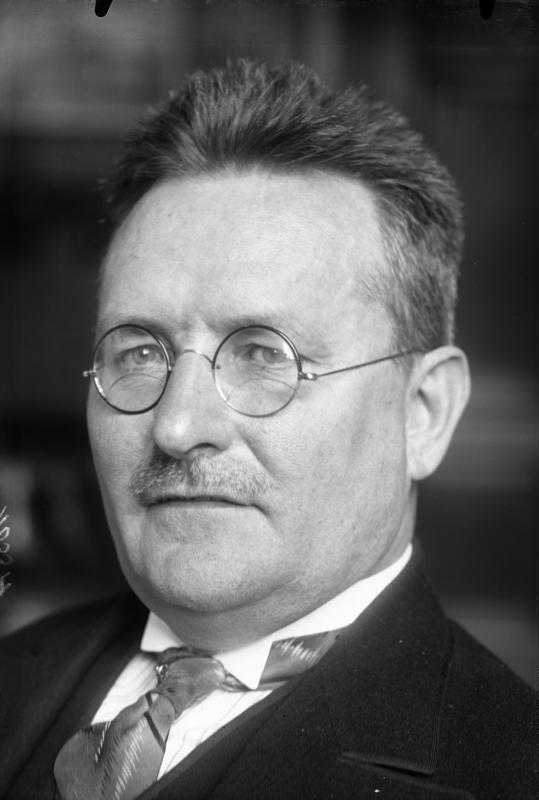
- Löbe in 1924

President of the Reichstag
- In office 7 January 1925 – 30 August 1932
- Preceded by: Max Wallraf
- Succeeded by: Hermann Göring
- In office 25 June 1920 – 28 May 1924
- Preceded by: Constantin Fehrenbach
- Succeeded by: Max Wallraf

Member of the Reichstag
- In office 24 June 1920 – 1 February 1933
- Constituency: Breslau

Personal details
- Born: 14 December 1875 Liegnitz, Prussia, German Empire
- Died: 3 August 1967 (aged 91) Bonn, West Germany
- Party: Social Democratic Party of Germany (SPD)

Paul Gustav Emil Löbe (14 December 1875 – 3 August 1967) was a German politician of the Social Democratic Party of Germany (SPD), a member and president of the Reichstag of the Weimar Republic, and member of the Bundestag of West Germany. He died in Bonn in 1967.

== Childhood through World War I ==
Paul Löbe was the first of four children born to the carpenter Heinrich Löbe (1843–1898) and his wife Pauline, née Leuschner (1852–1947) in Liegnitz (since 1945 Legnica in Poland) in the Prussian province of Silesia. As a child, he contributed to the family's income as an errand boy delivering newspapers and bread rolls. From his father, he developed his political interests in workers' causes. Between 1882 and 1890 he attended elementary school in Liegnitz and then from 1890 to 1895 completed an apprenticeship as a typesetter at the plant where the Liegnitzer Anzeiger newspaper was printed. He had wanted to become a teacher, but the family lacked the money for the necessary training. Between November 1891 and April 1892, he published his first articles under the pseudonym and anagram Alu Pöbel (Pöbel means "rabble" or "riffraff" in German) in the Social Democratic paper Breslauer Volkswacht. From 1895 to 1898, he worked in several cities in southern Germany and traveled in Austria-Hungary, Italy and Switzerland. After his father's death in 1898, he returned to Silesia to support his mother. He worked at a print shop in Breslau (now Wroclaw, Poland) as a typesetter at the Breslauer Volkswacht. In 1899, he was made editor of the paper and was editor-in-chief from 1903 to 1919. As a social democratic editor, he addressed social grievances and sometimes blamed the authorities for them. It led to him being sentenced to prison several times or fined for lèse-majesté and inciting class hatred. He spent 1906 in solitary confinement after he called for a demonstration against the Prussian three-class franchise, which gave more weight to the votes of those who paid more in taxes.

Löbe was a member of the SPD beginning in 1895. In 1898, he founded the SPD local association of Ilmenau in Thuringia. In 1899, he became chairman of the SPD in the district of central Silesia, which included Breslau and was elected to Breslau's city government in 1904.

Between two prison sentences of several months in length, Löbe became engaged to Clara Schaller (1879–1964), a native of Liegnitz, and married her in 1901. They had one son. Due to a lung disease that kept him from being drafted, Löbe did not take part in World War I.

== Weimar Republic ==
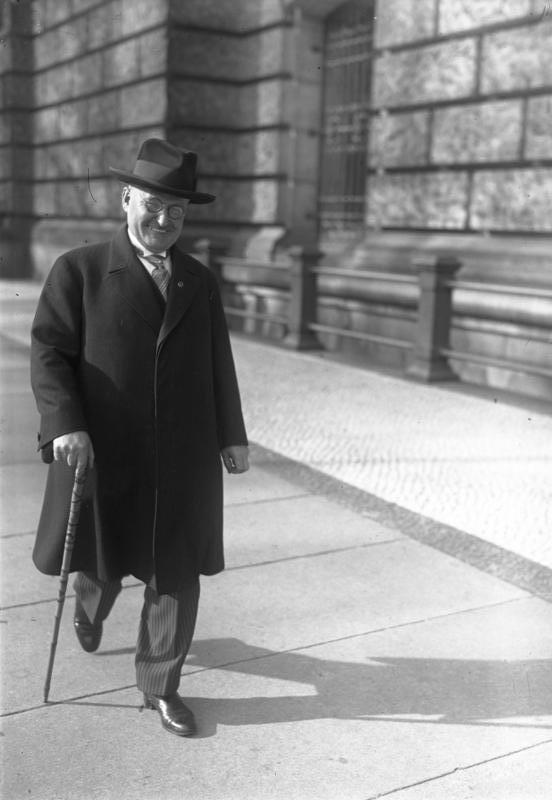
Löbe on his way to the Reichstag, October 1930

Between 1904 and 1919, Löbe was in the Breslau city council and, from 1915 to 1920, a member of the provincial parliament (Landtag) of Silesia. During the German Revolution of 1918–1919, Löbe declined to join the Council of the People's Deputies, the interim body under Friedrich Ebert (SPD) that led the country during the turbulent post-war months, because he felt himself "not yet sufficiently prepared for such a task". In the election of January 1919, the first in Germany with full suffrage for both women and men, Löbe was elected to the Weimar National Assembly, the parliamentary group that wrote the constitution of the Weimar Republic and served as Germany's interim Reichstag. In June 1919, he became one of the assembly's vice presidents. He was a member of the Reichstag from its first Weimar Republic sitting in 1920 until 1933. In 1921, he also became a member of the Prussian State Council (Staatsrat). From 1920 to 1924 (1st electoral period) and from 1925 to 1932 (3rd-5th electoral periods), he was president of the Reichstag, a position that was responsible for maintaining and organizing the Reichstag's self-government. In 1919 and 1920, he made efforts to reach an understanding with the moderate wing of the Independent Social Democratic Party (USPD), the antiwar and more left-leaning wing of the SPD that had broken away in 1917; it rejoined the SPD in 1922. After Ebert died in 1925, Löbe declined his party's offer to run as the SPD candidate in the presidential election against the conservative Paul von Hindenburg, who won in the second round. Löbe saw his place to be in the parliament. From 1932 to 1933 (7th electoral period), he was the Reichstag vice president.

In his function as Reichstag president, especially after October 1930, Löbe more and more often faced disturbances during Reichstag sessions, most of them coming from the Nazis and the Communist Party (KPD). Löbe met the challenge with a mixture of patience and severity in enforcing order against individual deputies.

On behalf of the SPD, he spoke out in favor of an accommodation with Poland. In 1927, he went to Warsaw and Lodz for talks with Polish politicians. He told them that the two countries should no longer fight each other politically but should cooperate economically. He suggested negotiations on disputed border issues in return for which the German Reich could offer trade agreements. In Lodz, however, where Löbe had been invited to an anniversary celebration of the local Social Democrats, Polish nationalists demonstrated against his visit. Nor did the men from the Warsaw leadership with whom he had talked respond to his proposals. After the trip, he complained about a lack of willingness to compromise on the Polish side.

As radio technology advanced, the question of the extent to which Reichstag sessions should be broadcast on the radio arose more and more often. In his radio address of 12 June 1930, Löbe advocated a time-delayed "occasional transmission of particularly important sessions" in which all party speakers would appear for roughly the same length of time, but the majority of the Reichstag's Council of Elders, a body that dealt with points of order, opposed it.

During the Weimar period, Löbe was also active in numerous organizations outside parliament. From 1921 to 1933, he was chairman of the Austro-German People's League, which advocated the unification of Austria with the German Reich. He was involved with politicians such as French Prime Minister Aristide Briand, the Czech leader Edvard Beneš, the Austrian Ignaz Seipel and the future chancellor of West Germany Konrad Adenauer in the Paneuropean Union, founded in 1922. For a time, Löbe was president of its German branch. He was a member of the Reichsbanner Schwarz-Rot-Gold (Reich banner black-red-gold), a multi-party organization formed in 1924 to defend parliamentary democracy in the Weimar Republic. In 1932 and 1933, he was editor of the SPD's newspaper Vorwärts.

== World War II to death ==
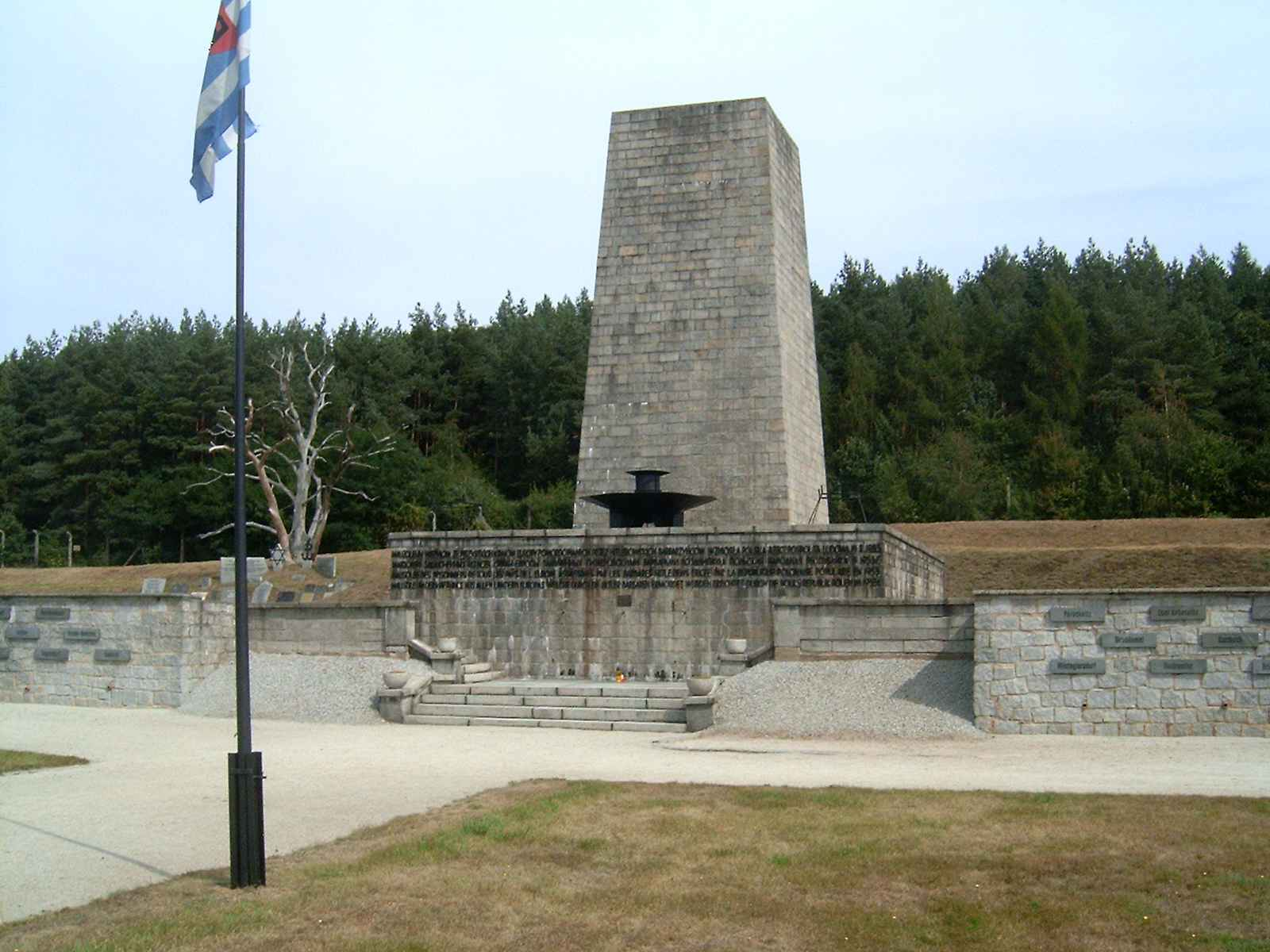
Memorial at Gross-Rosen Concentration Camp

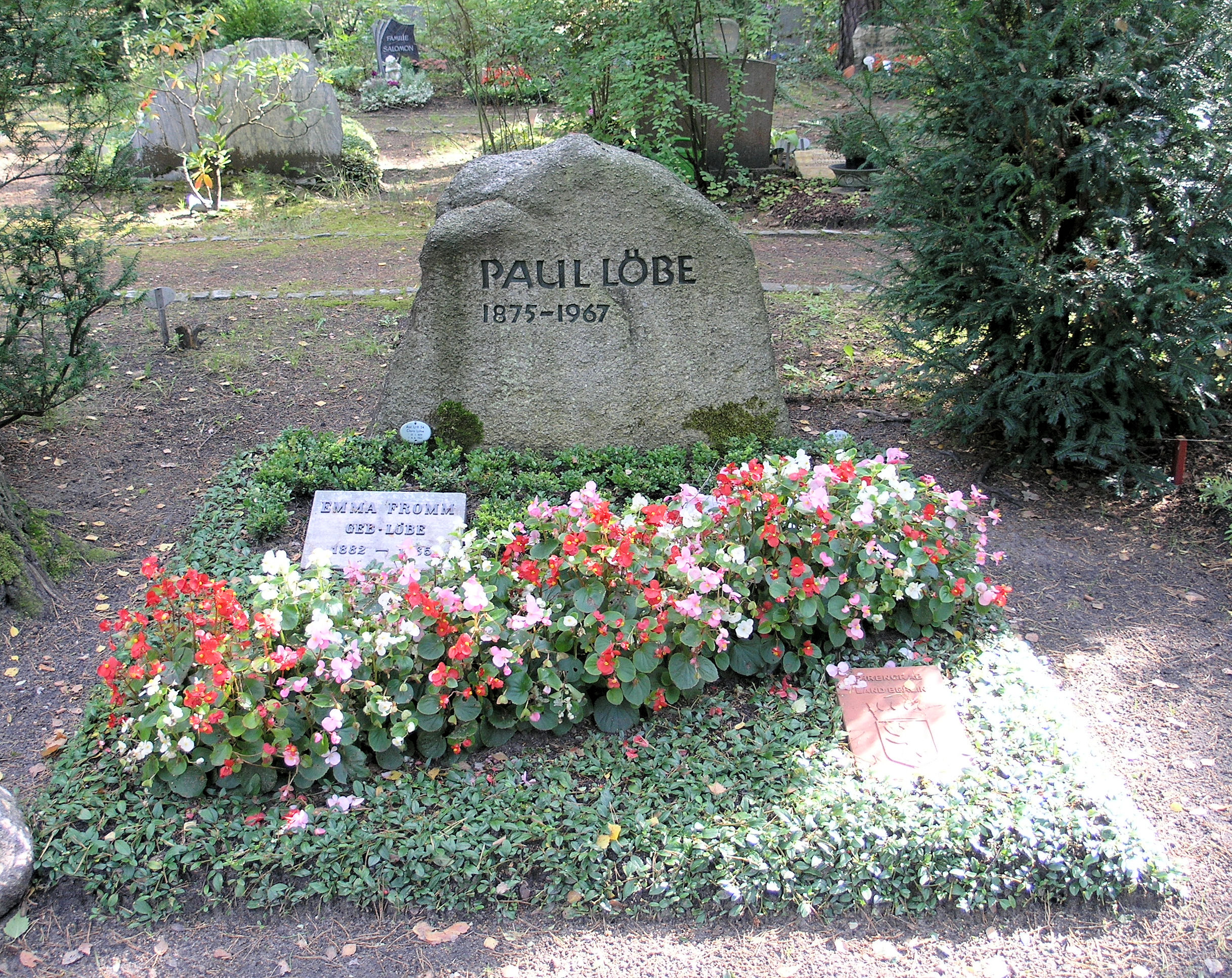
Löbe's grave in Berlin

On 26 April 1933, after Adolf Hitler came to power in Germany, Löbe was elected to the party executive of the SPD. In the wake of Hitler's so-called Peace Speech of 17 May 1933, in which he professed Germany's peaceful intentions in order to obtain further concessions from the Allies of World War I, Löbe agreed to the 'Peace Resolution' that Hitler also presented. On 19 June 1933, with Löbe's leading participation, the SPD decided to separate from the executive committee of the SPD in exile in Prague. Löbe expected there to be compromises from Hitler's government in return. For the same reason, no additional Jewish members were elected to the new party executive. The SPD was nevertheless banned on 22 June 1933.

The National Socialists imprisoned Löbe at the end of June 1933. He was in the Berlin prisons at Alexanderplatz and Spandau until the beginning of July 1933, then until mid-August in the Breslau-Dürrgoy concentration camp, where he was severely maltreated, then in the Alexanderplatz prison again until the end of December. After his release, he worked at the scholarly publishing house Walter de Gruyter. Löbe was later granted a pension of 600 Reichsmarks on Hitler's instructions, which was paid out until 1945. Although he had contacts with the Goerdeler anti-Nazi resistance circle, he was not arrested again until 23 August 1944 as part of Aktion Gitter, the mass arrests that took place after the failed assassination attempt on Hitler of 20 July 1944. In the Beck/Goerdeler cabinet that was to have been formed if the assassination and coup were successful, Löbe was slated to be the Reichstag president, but the interrogating Gestapo officials were unaware of this. After a short period in prison in Breslau, Löbe was sent to the Gross-Rosen concentration camp. He was released at the end of World War II in the spring of 1945.

When he was freed, Löbe was in county Glatz, Lower Silesia (today Kłodzko in Poland), from which he, along with all other German inhabitants, was expelled according to the resolutions of the Potsdam Agreement. In the summer of 1945, he went to Berlin, where he lived in the American occupation zone and became involved again with the SPD. He played a key role in its rebuilding and became a member of the party's Berlin Central Committee where he strongly opposed the SPD's forced unification with the Communist Party of Germany to form the Socialist Unity Party of Germany in the Soviet occupation zone. He therefore left the Central Committee of the Soviet zone SPD and became involved in the SPD of the western sectors, which remained independent. In 1947, he was appointed chairman of the SPD's Foreign Policy Committee.

In 1948/1949, Löbe, as a non-voting West Berlin deputy, was a member of the Parliamentary Council, the constituent assembly that drafted and adopted the constitution for West Germany. He was also deputy chairman of the SPD parliamentary group in the Council. From 1949 to 1953, Löbe was a member of the German Bundestag. Since he was from Berlin, he could not be elected by the people due to Allied restrictions, but was delegated to Bonn by the West Berlin House of Representatives as a non-voting member of the Bundestag. He was the oldest parliamentarian and thus the "Father of the House" of the first German Bundestag. Konrad Adenauer, who was three weeks younger, was the second oldest, outliving him by three and a half months. In his opening speech in the Bundestag, Löbe appealed to his countrymen to work for a united "free Germany" that "wants to be a member of a united Europe".

Löbe remained in the party until the end of his life and was particularly committed to the interests of German expellees, the estimated 12 million ethnic Germans who were expelled from their homes in areas lost to Germany (among them Silesia) and from other countries in eastern Europe such as Czechoslovakia where they had lived.

In 1945, he became editor of the daily newspaper Das Volk, and later a co-publisher of the Telegraf, a daily newspaper close to the SPD in the British sector of Berlin. In 1949 Löbe became the founding president of the European Movement Germany. From 1954 until his death he was chairman of the Advisory Board of Indivisible Germany, an organization whose aim was the peaceful reunification of Germany. He died in West Germany's capital, Bonn, on 3 August 1967 and was given an honorary grave by the city of Berlin.

== Honors ==
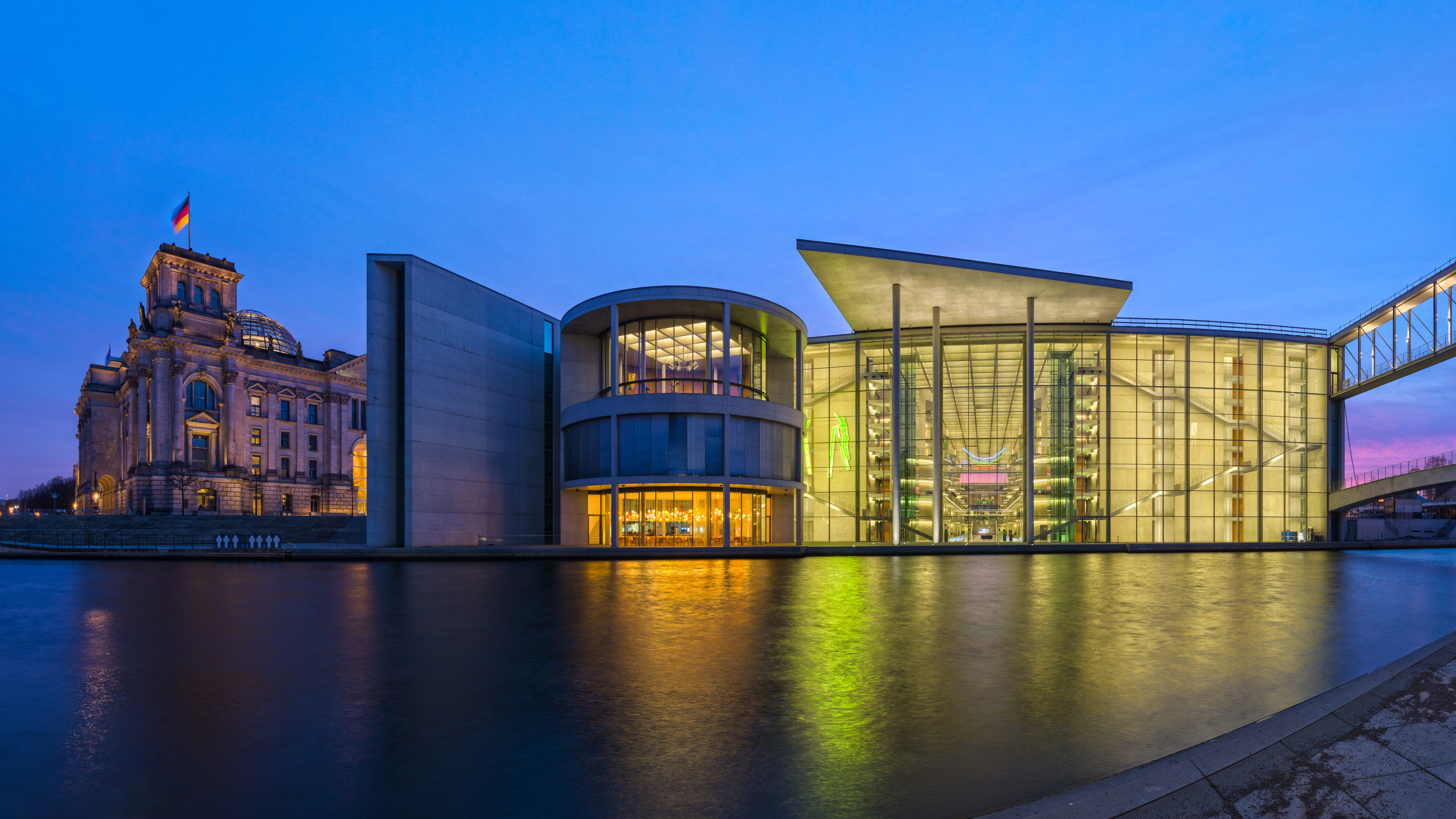
Paul-Löbe-Haus, Berlin

Löbe was awarded the Grand Cross of the Order of Merit of the Federal Republic of Germany in 1951. On 14 December 1955, he received honorary citizenship of the city of Berlin. He was also an honorary member of the Free University of Berlin and a recipient of the Badge of Honor of the Federation of Expellees. On 9 June 1961, he was the first to be honored with the Silesian Shield of the Homeland Association of Silesia.

After Löbe's death, a state ceremony was held in his honor in Berlin on 9 August 1967. The coffin was laid out covered with the flag of the Federal Republic. In addition to the family, the mourners included a representative of the Federal President, President of the Bundesrat Helmut Lemke. In their speeches, Bundestag President Eugen Gerstenmaier, Chancellor Kurt Georg Kiesinger, Governing Mayor of Berlin Heinrich Albertz and SPD Chairman Willy Brandt praised Löbe's work. At the same time, political activists from Kommune 1 held a satirical funeral in John F. Kennedy Square.

One of the new parliamentary buildings (2002), which serves Bundestag members in Berlin, is named the Paul Löbe House.

== Selected writing ==
- Löbe, Paul, Erinnerungen eines Reichstagspräsidenten [Memoirs of a Reich President], Berlin 1949, republished as Der Weg war lang: Lebenserinnerungen [The Road was Long; Memoirs], Berlin, 1953, 1954, 2002 (fifth edition).
- Löbe, Paul, "Gegenwartsfragen des Parlamentarismus" [Contemporary issues of Parliamentarism], in: Für und Wider. Lebensfragen deutscher Politik [Pros and Cons. Life Questions of German Politics], Offenbach am Main, 1952, pp. 39 to 48.
- Löbe, Paul, "Aus dem Parlamentarischen Leben" [From a Parliamentary Life], in: Hessische Hochschulwochen für Staatswissenschaftliche Fortbildung [Hessian University Weeks for Advanced Training in Political Science], Volume 3, 1953, pp. 312 to 318.

== Literature ==
- Helmut Neubach: "Paul Löbe". In: Schlesische Lebensbilder. Band 6, 1990, pp. 222–233.
- Helmut Neubach: "Paul Löbe". Bund der Vertriebenen, Bonn 2000, ISBN 3-925103-94-5.
- Mitglieder des Reichstags-Die Reichstagsabgeordneten der Weimarer Republik in der Zeit des Nationalsozialismus. Politische Verfolgung, Emigration und Ausbürgerung 1933–1945. Eine biographische Dokumentation. Mit einem Forschungsbericht zur Verfolgung deutscher und ausländischer Parliamentarier im nationalsozialistischen Herrschaftsbereich, hrsg. von Martin Schumacher u.a., Düsseldorf, 3d ed. 1994, pp. 291, 293f. (= Veröffentlichung der Kommission für Geschichte des Parliamentarismus und der politischen Parteien in Bonn).
- Gerhard Beier: "Löbe, Paul". In: Manfred Asendorf und Rolf von Bockel (Hrsg.): Demokratische Wege. Deutsche Lebensläufe aus fünf Jahrhunderten. Stuttgart und Weimar 1997, pp. 393–395.
- Erhard H. M. Lange: Gestalter des Grundgesetzes. Die Abgeordneten des Parlamentarischen Rates. 15 historische Biographien. Brühl/Rheinland 1999, pp. 111–119.
- Theodor Oliwa: Paul Löbe. Ein sozialdemokratischer Politiker und Redakteur. Die schlesischen Jahre (1875–1919). Neustadt 2003 (= Quellen und Darstellungen zur schlesischen Geschichte, Band 30).
- Jürgen Mittag: "Vom Honoratiorenkreis zum Europanetzwerk: Sechs Jahrzehnte europäische Bewegung Deutschland". In: 60 Jahre Europäische Bewegung Deutschland. Berlin 2009; pp. 12–28.

Political offices
Preceded by Constantin Fehrenbach	President of the Reichstag; 1920–1924	Succeeded by Max Wallraf
Preceded by Max Wallraf	President of the Reichstag; 1925–1932	Succeeded by Hermann Göring
