= Eduard von Simson =

German jurist and politician (1810–1899)

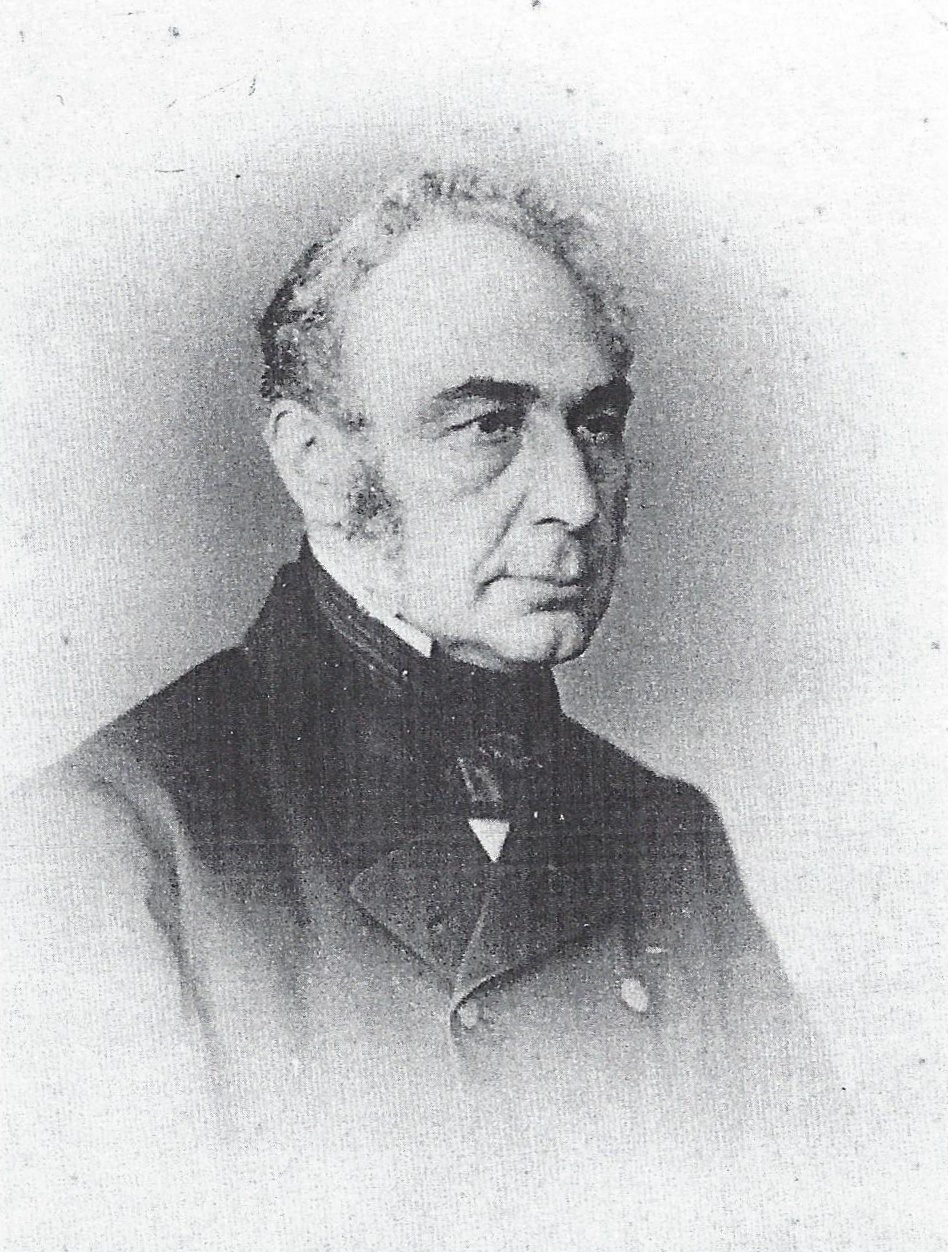

President of the Frankfurt Parliament
- In office December 1848 – May 1849

President of the Reichstag (North German Confederation)
- In office 1867–1871

President of the Reichstag
- In office 1871–1877
- Succeeded by: Max von Forckenbeck

President of the Reichsgericht
- In office 1 October 1879 – 1 February 1891

Personal details
- Born: 10 November 1810 Königsberg, Kingdom of Prussia
- Died: 2 May 1899 (aged 88) Berlin, German Empire
- Profession: jurist

Martin Sigismund Eduard von Simson (10 November 1810 – 2 May 1899) was a German jurist and distinguished liberal politician of the Kingdom of Prussia and German Empire, who served as President of the Frankfurt Parliament as well as the first President of the German Parliament and of the Imperial Court. He was ennobled by Kaiser Frederick III in 1888.

== Education ==
Eduard Simson was born in Königsberg, East Prussia, in a Jewish family. The family converted to Protestantism in 1823. After the usual course at the Gymnasium of his native town, he entered its university in 1826 as a student of jurisprudence, and specially of Roman law. He continued his studies at Berlin and Bonn, and, having graduated doctor juris, attended lectures at the École de Droit in Paris. Returning to Königsberg in 1831, he established himself as a Privatdozent in Roman law, becoming two years later extraordinary, and in 1836 ordinary, professor in the faculty of the university.

== National Assembly ==
Like many other distinguished German jurists, pari passu with his professorial activity, Simson followed the judicial branch of the legal profession, and, passing rapidly through the subordinate stages of auscultator and assessor, became adviser (Rath) to the Landgericht in 1846. In this year, he stood for the representation of Königsberg in the National Assembly at Frankfurt am Main, and on his election was immediately appointed secretary, and in the course of the same year became its vice-president and president successively.

== Frederick William IV ==
In Berlin on 3 April 1849, Simson appeared in his capacity of president at the head of a deputation of the Frankfurt Parliament to announce to King Frederick William IV his election as German Emperor by the representatives of the people. The king, either apprehensive of a rupture with the Austrian Empire, or fearing detriment to the prerogatives of the Prussian crown should he accept this dignity at the hands of a democracy, refused the offer. Simson, bitterly disappointed at the outcome of his mission, resigned his seat in the Frankfurt Parliament, but in the summer of the same year was elected deputy for Königsberg in the popular chamber of the Prussian Landtag. Here, he soon made his mark as one of the best orators in that assembly. A member of the short-lived Erfurt Parliament of 1850, he was again summoned to the presidential chair.

== Prussian Landtag ==
On the dissolution of the Erfurt assembly, Simson retired from politics and for the next few years devoted himself exclusively to his academic and judicial duties. It was not until 1859 that he re-entered public life, when he was elected deputy for Königsberg in the lower chamber of the Prussian Landtag, of which he was president in 1860 and 1861. In the first of these years, he attained high judicial office as president of the court of appeal at Frankfurt (Oder). In 1867, having been elected a member of the constituent assembly of the North German Confederation, he again occupied the presidential chair, as he did also in the first regular North German Reichstag and the Reichstag of the German Empire which succeeded it.

== William I ==
On 18 December 1870, Simson arrived at the head of a deputation in the German headquarters at Versailles to offer the imperial crown to the king of Prussia in the name of the newly elected Reichstag. The conditions under which Prussia might justly aspire to the hegemony in Germany at last appeared to have been accomplished; no obstacles, as in 1849, were in the way of the acceptance of the crown by the leading sovereign of the confederation, and on 18 January 1871 King William I of Prussia was proclaimed with all pomp German Emperor in the Salle des Glaces at Palace of Versailles.

== Reichsgericht ==
Simson continued as president of the Reichstag until 1874, when he retired from the chair, and in 1877 resigned his seat in the Diet, but at Otto von Bismarck's urging, accepted the presidency of the supreme court of justice (Reichsgericht). He filled this high office with great distinction until his final retirement from public life in 1891.

His grave is preserved in the Protestant Friedhof III der Jerusalems- und Neuen Kirchengemeinde (Cemetery No. III of the congregations of Jerusalem's Church and New Church) in Berlin-Kreuzberg, south of Hallesches Tor.

== Tributes ==
In 1997, the square in front of the Reich Court building in Leipzig, Simsonplatz, was named in his honor.

== Orders and decorations ==
- Kingdom of Prussia:
  - Knight of the Royal Order of the Crown, 1st Class, 18 January 1881
  - Knight of the Order of the Red Eagle, 1st Class (50 years) with Oak Leaves and Enamel Band of the Royal Crown Order, 15 May 1883
  - Knight of the Order of the Black Eagle, 1888
