= Max von Forckenbeck =

German lawyer and politician

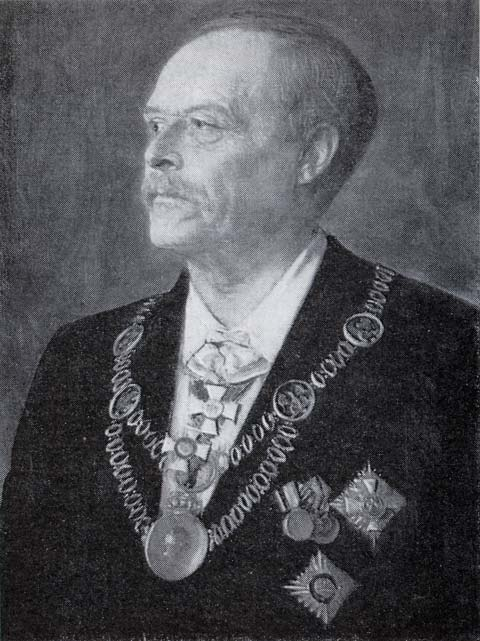
- Portrait by Franz von Lenbach (1891)

Mayor of Breslau
- In office 1872–1878
- Preceded by: Arthur Hobrecht
- Succeeded by: Ferdinand Julius Ernst Friedensburg

Mayor of Berlin
- In office 21 November 1878 – 26 May 1892
- Preceded by: Arthur Hobrecht
- Succeeded by: Robert Zelle

Member of the Reichstag
- In office 1871–1892

President of the Reichstag
- In office 1874–1879
- Preceded by: Eduard von Simson
- Succeeded by: Otto Von Seydewitz

Personal details
- Born: 23 October 1821 Münster, Westphalia, Kingdom of Prussia
- Died: 26 May 1892 (aged 70) Berlin, Germany
- Party: Progressive; National Liberal (from 1867)
- Education: Frederick William University, Berlin
- Profession: Lawyer

Maximilian "Max" Franz August von Forckenbeck (23 October 1821 – 26 May 1892) was a German lawyer and liberal politician who served as Mayor of Berlin from 1878 until his death. He is considered one of the most important mayors of the city because of his prudent governing style during Berlin's rise as the capital of a unified Germany.

== Life ==
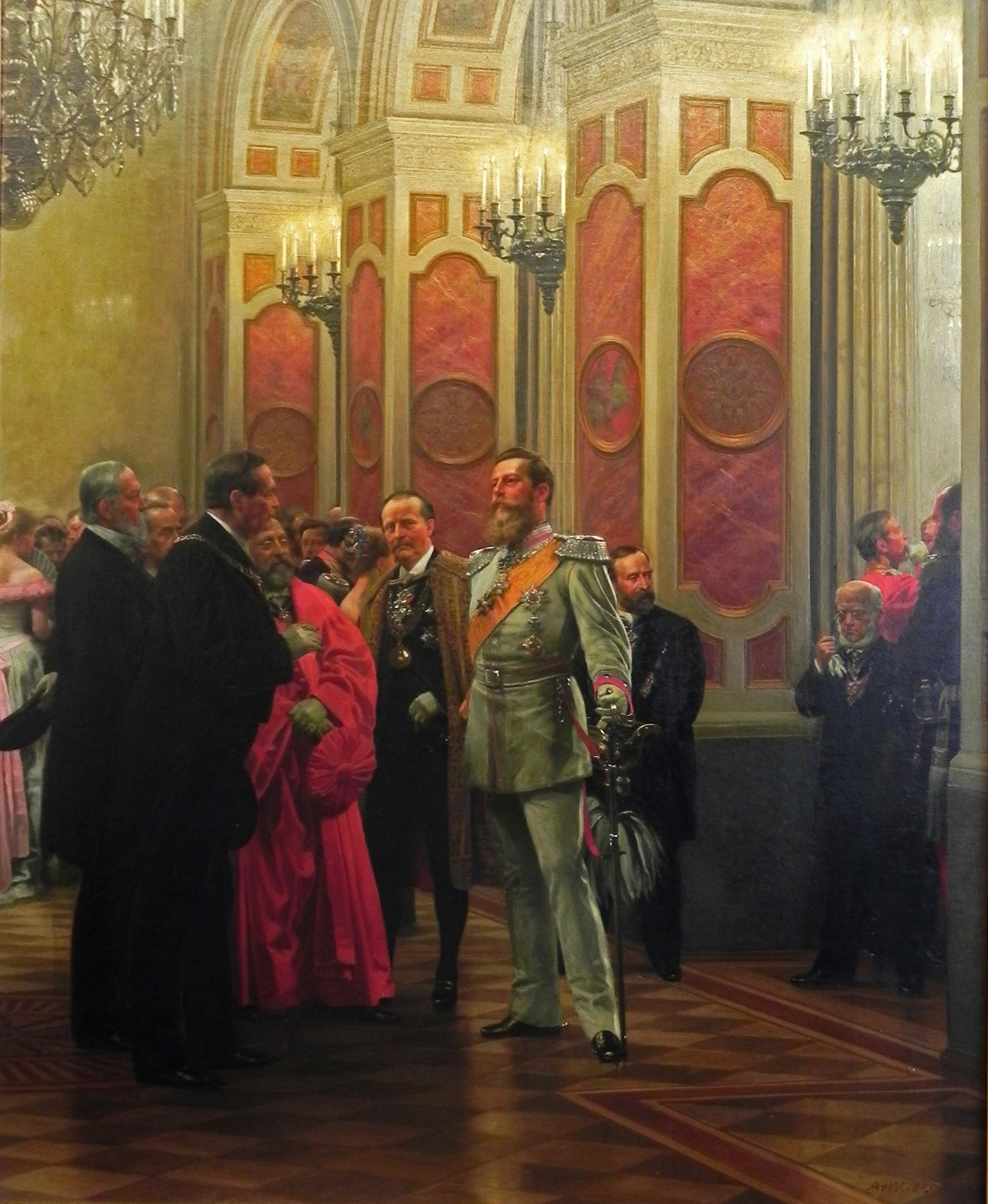
Mayor Forckenbeck (left) and Crown Prince Frederick at the Berlin Court Ball 1878, painting by Anton von Werner (1895)

Max Forckenbeck was born in Münster in the Prussian province of Westphalia. From 1838, he studied law at the University of Giessen in Hesse, where he joined the Corps Teutonia fraternity. He completed his studies at the Frederick William University in Berlin. As a law graduate, he served first as a Referendar from 1842, from 1847 as an Assessor at the municipal court in Glogau, Silesia. Upon the March Revolution of 1848, he acted as president of the Glogauer Konstitutioneller Verein. In 1849, he received his admission as attorney-at-law in Mohrungen, East Prussia.

In 1858, Forckenbeck joined the newly established Congress of German Economists, an association promoting free trade and economic freedom. From 1859, he held a seat in the Mohrungen municipal assembly and was elected a member of the liberal faction in the Prussian House of Representatives (Preußisches Abgeordnetenhaus). He quickly set out to launch a liberal party. After a controversy with traditional liberal deputies around Georg von Vincke, Forckenbeck on 6 June 1861 founded the German Progress Party (Deutsche Fortschrittspartei). Also in 1861, he managed the Committee of the German National Association, which he had joined in 1859.

When the Prussian Constitutional Conflict between the Prussian House of Representatives and King William I broke out in 1862, Forckenbeck, as leader of the Progressive Party, avoided an open debate with the new Prussian minister president Otto von Bismarck. Due to his prudent efforts toward an understanding, he was made President of the House of Representatives from 1866 to 1873. After the Prussian-led unification of Germany in 1871, he was President of the Reichstag parliament from the federal election of 1874 until 1879. During that time, in 1866–1867, Forckenbeck, along with others, founded the National Liberal Party, a right-wing offshoot of the Progressives. On 8 July 1872, he was elected Mayor of Breslau (Wroclaw) in Silesia.

Beginning in 1873, Forckenbeck was an appointed member of the Prussian House of Lords. On 26 September 1878, he was elected Mayor of Berlin by an overwhelming majority. From 1879, he dedicated his time exclusively to his new position, stepping down as President of the Reichstag. During his time in office, Forckenbeck devoted his time to reforming the education system and developing the city's infrastructure. In his first term, he improved the sewage system and expanded the city's water supply. Furthermore, he improved the city's hygiene by offering recreational opportunities like those at Viktoriapark in Kreuzberg. Forckenbeck was heavily in favor of the privatization of the urban sector, pushing through laws allowing private companies to manage the city's street lights. On 1 April 1881, the city became Stadtkreis Berlin, a city district separate from the surrounding Province of Brandenburg.

Buoyed by high popularity, Forckenbeck was easily re-elected in 1890. During his second term, he tried to improve the relationship between state and city governments; he also aimed at the incorporation of the Berlin suburbs, which, however, did not take place until the 1920 Greater Berlin Act. In 1892, at the age of 70, Max Forckenbeck died from pneumonia. His grave is found at the Protestant Nicolaikirchhof.
