= Franz von Ballestrem =

German politician, Reichstag

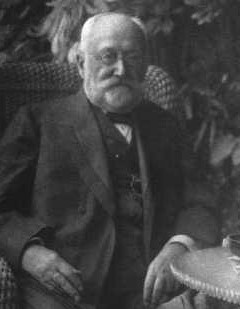
- Count Franz von Ballestrem

President of the Reichstag
- In office December 1898 – 20 February 1907
- Monarch: Wilhelm II
- Preceded by: Rudolf von Buol-Berenberg
- Succeeded by: Udo zu Stolberg-Wernigerode

Personal details
- Born: 5 September 1834 Pławniowice, Province of Silesia, Kingdom of Prussia
- Died: 23 December 1910 (aged 76) Pławniowice, Province of Silesia, Kingdom of Prussia, German Empire
- Party: Centre Party

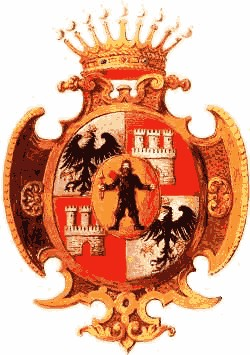
Coat of arms of Graf Ballestrem

Franz von Ballestrem (5 September 1834 – 23 December 1910) was a German entrepreneur, manager and politician for Centre Party.

== Early life ==
Franz was born on 5 September 1834 in Plawniowitz (today in Poland) into the House of Ballerstrem, which belonged to an old German nobility. He was the son of Carl Wolfgang von Ballestrem (1801–1879) and his wife, Betha von Leithold (1803–1874).

== Biography ==
He went to Adelskonvikt in Lviv. Between 1848 and 1851, he went to school in Głogów and Namur. He studied at Berg Academy in Liège. Ballestrem was in the Prussian Army in 1855. In 1857, he became a Prussian Army Officer in 1st (Silesian) Life Cuirassiers "Great Elector". He was a soldier in the Austro-Prussian War of 1866 and the Franco-Prussian War of 1870/1871. From 1867, he was Rittmeister. After the death of his father, he owned a majorat in Plawniowitz in Silesia.

From 1872 to 1893 and from 1898 to 1907, Ballestrem was a member of the Reichstag of the German Empire. From 1898 to 1907, Ballestrem was president of the Reichstag. From 1891, Ballestrem was also a member of the Prussian House of Representatives, serving as such until in 1903 he was granted a hereditary seat in the Prussian House of Lords by the Emperor.

In 1872, he was vice president of Katholikentag in Breslau. In 1890, he was the founder and president of People's Association for Catholic Germany in Silesia. In 1873, Ballestrem was a Papal gentleman (Camerieri Segreti di Spada e Cappa). He was a member of Order of the Holy Sepulchre and of Sovereign Military Order of Malta.

== Marriage and issue ==
On 21 June 1858, he married Countess Hedwig von Saurma, Freiin von und zu der Jeltsch (12 November 1838 – 5 March 1915). Together, they had nine children:

- Valentin Wolfgang Gustav Alexander Joseph Christian (21 December 1860 – 17 May 1920) ∞ Countess Agnes zu Stolberg-Stolberg (11 May 1874 – 26 March 1940)
- Johann Baptists Wolfgang Karl Raphael (24 October 1866 –27 July 1929)
- Pia Hedwigis Luise Katharina Viktoria (10 February 1869 – 10 July 1918)
- Bertha Maria Ludmilla Maritia (7 April 1870 – 19 May 1939)
- Gustav Franz Xaver Wolfgang Maria Friedrich Meinrad (born 16 April 1872 – 24 April 1909)
- Leo Wolfgang (20 October 1873 – 4 July 1915) ∞ Eva von Durant (18 October 1882 – 10 April 1958)
- Ludwig-Carl (5 October 1875 – 6 March 1957)
- Elisabeth (16 April 1878 – 15 March 1969)
- Marco (26 April 1881 – 17 April 1965)

== Death ==
Franz von Ballestrem died on 23 December 1910 in Plawniowitz, at the age of 76. His wife Hedwig, outlived him for 5 years.

== Literature ==
- Eckhard Hansen, Florian Tennstedt (ed.) u. a.: Biographisches Lexikon zur Geschichte der deutschen Sozialpolitik 1871 bis 1945. Band 1: Sozialpolitiker im Deutschen Kaiserreich 1871 bis 1918. Kassel University Press, Kassel 2010, ISBN 978-3-86219-038-6, p. 7f. (Online, pdf-file).
- Anton Ritthaler (1953). "Ballestrem, Franz Karl Wolfgang Graf von". Neue Deutsche Biographie (in German). Vol. 1. Berlin: Duncker & Humblot. p. 561. (full text online).
- Acta Borussica Band 8/I (1890–1900) (pdf-file)
- Acta Borussica Band 8/II (1890–1900) Kurzbiografie on p. 487. (pdf-file)
- Acta Borussica Band 9 (1900–1909) Kurzbiografie auf p. 329. (pdf-file)
- Acta Borussica Band 10 (1909–1918) Kurzbiografie auf p. 359. (pdf-file)
- Gothaisches genealogisches Taschenbuch der gräflichen Häuser auf das Jahr 1876, p.56
