= Wellendingen =

- Municipality
- Coat of arms

- Location of Wellendingen within Rottweil district
- Interactive map of Wellendingen
- Location within Germany Location within Baden-Württemberg
- Coordinates: 48°08′52″N 08°42′03″E
- Country: Germany
- State: Baden-Württemberg
- Admin. region: Freiburg
- District: Rottweil

Government
  - Mayor (2024–32): Thomas Albrecht

Area
  - Total: 17.47 km^{2} (6.75 sq mi)
- Elevation: 638 m (2,093 ft)

Population (2025-12-31)
  - Total: 3,426
  - Density: 196.1/km^{2} (507.9/sq mi)
- Time zone: UTC+01:00 (CET)
  - Summer (DST): UTC+02:00 (CEST)
- Postal codes: 78669
- Dialling codes: 07426
- Vehicle registration: RW
- Website: www.wellendingen.de

Wellendingen (Swabian: Welledinge) is a town in the district of Rottweil, in Baden-Württemberg, Germany.
