= Wilhelm von Wedell-Piesdorf =

German politician

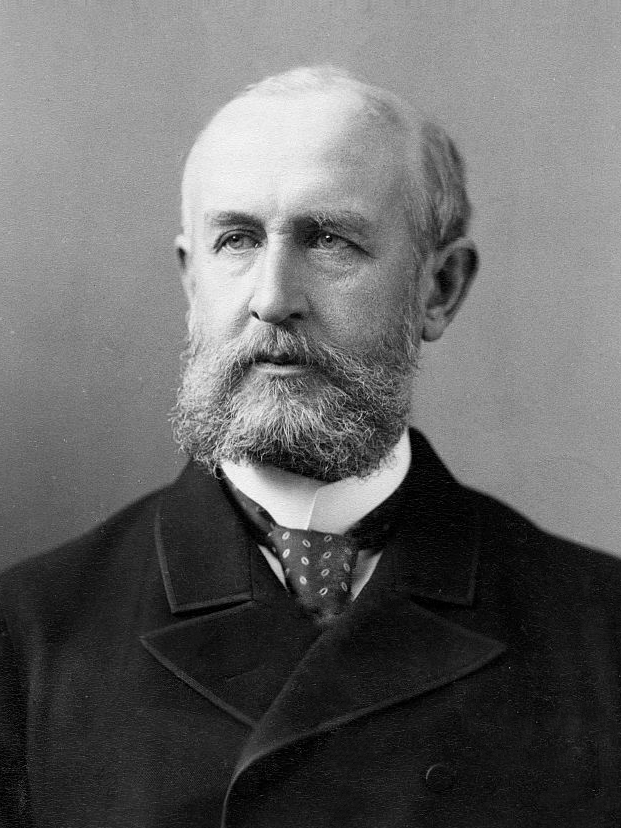
- Photograph of von Wedell-Piesdorf, 1896

President of the Reichstag
- In office November 1884 – November 1888
- Preceded by: Albert von Levetzow
- Succeeded by: Albert von Levetzow

Personal details
- Born: Karl Heinrich Magnus Wilhelm von Wedell-Piesdorf; 20 May 1837 Frankfurt (Oder), Kingdom of Prussia
- Died: 11 July 1915 (aged 78) Berlin, German Empire
- Party: Conservative

Karl Heinrich Magnus Wilhelm von Wedell-Piesdorf (20 May 1837 – 11 July 1915) was a German landowner and politician for German Conservative Party.

== Early life ==
Wedell-Piesdorf was born on 20 May 1837 in Frankfurt-an-Oder into the noble von Wedel family. He was a son of Busso von Wedell (1804–1874), a Prussian tax official and district president, and Baroness Pauline von der Recke (1805–1859). Among his siblings was brother Karl von Wedel-Piesdorf, a prominent lawyer.

He initially studied law at the Ruprecht-Karls-University of Heidelberg. In 1856, he became active in the Corps Saxo-Borussia Heidelberg. He later attended Friedrich Wilhelm University in Berlin.

== Career ==
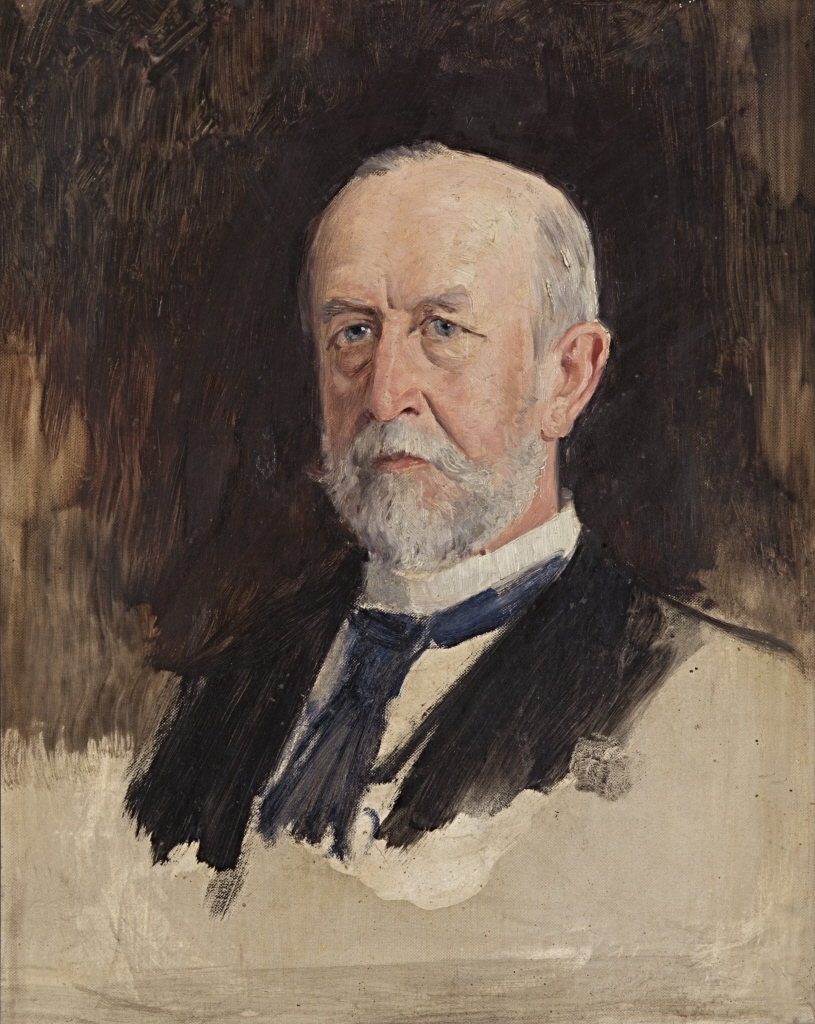
Portrait of von Wedell-Piesdorf, by William Pape, c. 1900–1905

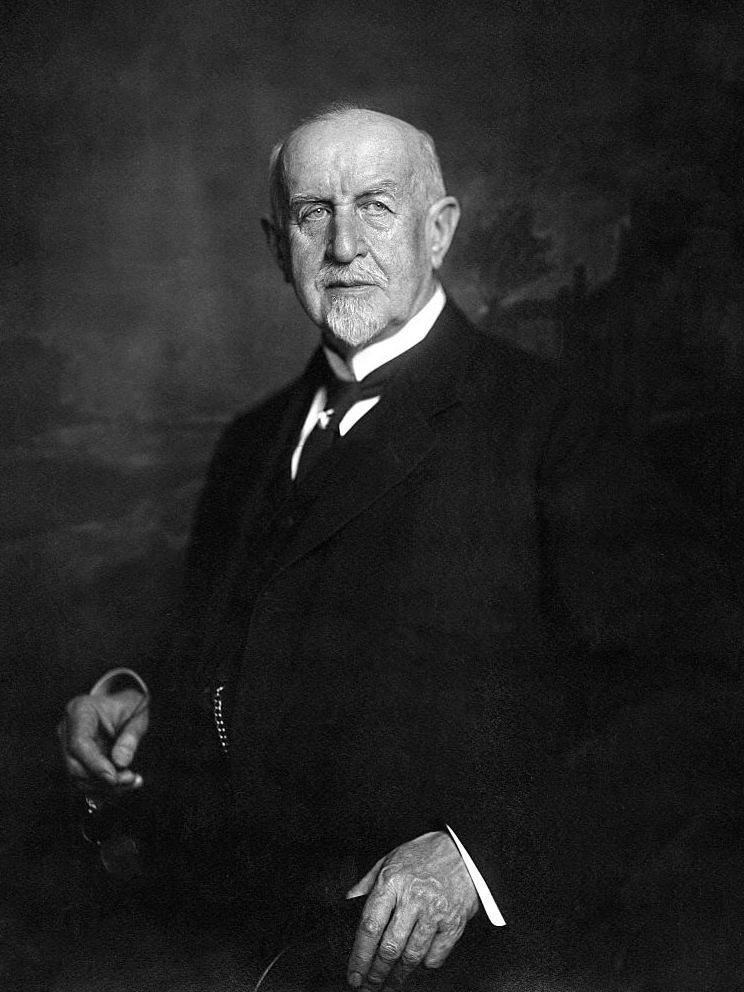
Photograph of von Wedell-Piesdorf c. 1910

In 1858, he joined the Prussian judicial service as an auscultator (trainee lawyer), became a government trainee in Erfurt, a government assessor in Magdeburg and then district administrator in the Wolmirstedt district from 1870 to 1872 and in the Mansfelder Land district from 1871 to 1876. He left civil service in 1876 to take over the administration of his Piesdorf manor (near Könnern). As a large landowner, he was a member of the German Farmers' Association. In 1881, von Wedell accepted the appointment as district president in the Magdeburg district, which he held until 1888.

From 1879 to 1885, he represented the Sangerhausen constituency as a Conservative member of the Prussian House of Representatives. From 1884 to 1890, he was a Free Conservative member of the Reichstag, representing the Erfurt constituency. Immediately after his election to the Reichstag, he was also elected its president. In 1885, he became a member of the Prussian House of Lords, before becoming its president in 1912 (until 1915). In 1888, he was made Minister of the Royal Household by Kaiser Wilhelm II, serving in that role until 1907.

Wedell was a Chancellor of the Order of St. John. From 1910 to 1937, the Wedellplatz in Berlin-Friedrichsfelde was named after him.

== Personal life ==
On 10 January 1871, he married Editha Sophie von Kotze (1843–1946), daughter of a former Landrat, at Klein Oschersleben Castle in Oschersleben. Together, they were the parents of one daughter:

- Klara Pauline von Wedell-Piesdorf (1872–1946), who married Count Johannes von Bismarck-Bohlen, a son of General Friedrich Alexander von Bismarck-Bohlen. (Note: General Friedrich Alexander von Bismarck-Bohlen (1818–1894) was the son of Theodor von Bismarck-Bohlen (1790–1873), a cousin of the Chancellor of Germany Otto von Bismarck.)

Wedell-Piesdorf died on 11 July 1915 in Berlin.

== Honours ==
- Kingdom of Prussia:
  - Knight of Honour of the Johanniter Order, 1877; Knight of Justice, 1884
  - Knight of the Order of the Red Eagle, 2nd Class with Oak Leaves, 18 January 1886; 1st Class with Crown, 12 June 1892
  - Commander's Cross of the Royal House Order of Hohenzollern, with Star, 27 January 1893
  - Knight of the Order of the Black Eagle, 15 June 1898; with Collar, 17 January 1899
- (Austrian Empire) (Kingdom of Hungary) Austria-Hungary: Grand Cross of the Austrian Imperial Order of Leopold, 1889
- Grand Duchy of Hesse: Grand Cross of the Merit Order of Philip the Magnanimous, 26 January 1893
- Norway: Grand Cross of the Royal Norwegian Order of Saint Olav, 15 December 1906
- Kingdom of Saxony: Grand Cross of the Albert Order, with Golden Star, 1893
- Sweden: Commander Grand Cross of the Royal Order of the Polar Star, 31 August 1888
- Württemberg: Grand Cross of the Order of the Württemberg Crown, 1892
