= Presidium of the Reichstag (Weimar Republic) =

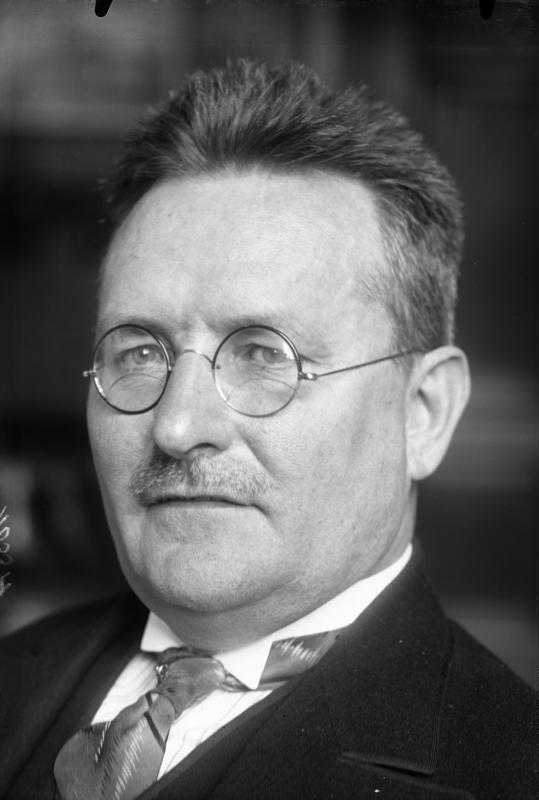
Portrait of Reichstag President Paul Löbe, President of Reichstag and Presidentium member in 1924

The Presidium of the Reichstag was a political office in the German Weimar Republic.

It consisted of the President of the Reichstag (Reichstagspräsident), First Deputy President (Erster Stellvertreter), Second Deputy President (Zweiter Stellvertreter) and Third Deputy President (Dritter Stellvertreter). The President was elected on the proposal of the largest party by the members of the Reichstag and remained in office until a successor had been elected.

== National Assembly (1919-1920) ==
Presidium elected on February 7, 1919

President	Party	Notes
Eduard David; Constantin Fehrenbach	SPD; Centre	To February 13, 1919; From February 14, 1919
Deputy President	Party	Notes
Hermann Dietrich; Constantin Fehrenbach; Conrad Haußmann; Hermann Schulz; Paul Löbe	DDP; Centre; DDP; SPD; SDP	To February 13, 1919 February 14, 1919–July 14, 1920; From July 15, 1920

== 1. Legislative Session (1920-1924) ==
President	Party	
Paul Löbe	SPD	
First Deputy President	Party	
Wilhelm Dittmann	USPD	
Second Deputy President	Party	
Johannes Bell	Centre	
Third Deputy President	Party	Notes
Hermann Dietrich; Jacob Rießer	DDP; DVP	From May 11, 1921

== 2. Legislative Session (1924) ==
President	Party
Max Wallraf	DNVP
First Deputy President	Party
Wilhelm Dittmann	SPD
Second Deputy President	Party
Johannes Bell	Centre
Third Deputy Speaker	Party
Jacob Rißer	DVP

== 3. Legislative Session (1924-1928) ==
President	Party	
Paul Löbe	SPD	
First Deputy President	Party	
Walther Graef	DNVP	
Second Deputy President	Party	Notes
Johannes Bell; Thomas Esser	Centre; Centre	To November 3, 1926; From November 4, 1926
Third Deputy President	Party	
Jacob Rißer	DVP	

== 4. Legislative Session (1928-1930) ==
President	Party
Paul Löbe	SPD
First Deputy President	Party
Thomas Eßer	Centre
Second Deputy President	Party
Siegfried von Kardorff	DVP
Third Deputy President	Party
Walther Graef	DNVP

== 5. Legislative Session (1930-1932) ==
President	Party	
Paul Löbe	SPD	
First Deputy President	Party	Notes
Franz Stöhr; Siegfried von Kardorff	NSDAP; DVP	To February 10, 1931; From February 12, 1931
Second Deputy President	Party	
Thomas Eßer	Centre	
Third Deputy President	Party	
Walther Graef	DNVP	

== 6. Legislative Session (1932) ==
President	Party
Hermann Göring	NSDAP
First Deputy President	Party
Thomas Eßer	Centre
Second Deputy President	Party
Walther Graef	DNVP
Third Deputy President	Party
Hans Rauch	BVP

== 7. Legislative Session (1932-1933) ==
President	Party
Hermann Göring	NSDAP
First Deputy President	Party
Thomas Eßer	Centre
Second Deputy President	Party
Hans Rauch	BVP
Third Deputy President	Party
Paul Löbe	SPD

== 8. Legislative Session (1933) ==
Presidium elected on March 12, 1933

President	Party
Hermann Göring	NSDAP
First Deputy President	Party
Thomas Eßer	Centre
Second Deputy President	Party
Walther Graef	DNVP
Third Deputy President	Party
Ernst Emil Zörner	NSDAP

== See also ==
- Presidium of the Reichstag (German Empire)
- Presidium of the Reichstag (Third Reich)
