= Presidium of the Reichstag (Nazi Germany) =

Presidium of the Reichstag (Nazi Germany)

It consisted of the Reichtagspräsident, Erster Stellvertreter (First Deputy President), Zweiter Stellvertreter (Second Deputy President) and Dritter Stellvertreter (Third Deputy President)

== 1. Legislative Session (1933) ==
Presidium elected on March 12, 1933

President
Hermann Göring
First Deputy President
Thomas Eßer
Second Deputy President
Walther Graef
Third Deputy President
Ernst Emil Zörner

== 2. Legislative Session (1933–1936) ==
Presidium elected on December 12, 1933

President
Hermann Göring
First Deputy President
Hanns Kerrl
Second Deputy President
Hermann Esser
Third Deputy President
Emil Georg von Stauß

== 3. Legislative Session (1936–1939) ==
Presidium elected on January 30, 1937

President
Hermann Göring
First Deputy President
Hanns Kerrl
Second Deputy President
Hermann Esser
Third Deputy President
Emil Georg von Stauß

== 4. Legislative Session (1939–1945) ==
Presidum elected on January 30, 1939

President	
Hermann Göring	
First Deputy President	Notes
Hanns Kerrl	Died on December 15, 1941
Second Deputy President	
Hermann Esser	
Third Deputy President	Notes
Emil Georg von Stauß	Died on December 11, 1942

== See also ==
- Presidium of the Reichstag (German Empire)
- Presidium of the Reichstag (Weimar Republic)
