= Theobald von Bethmann Hollweg =

Chancellor of the German Empire from 1909 to 1917

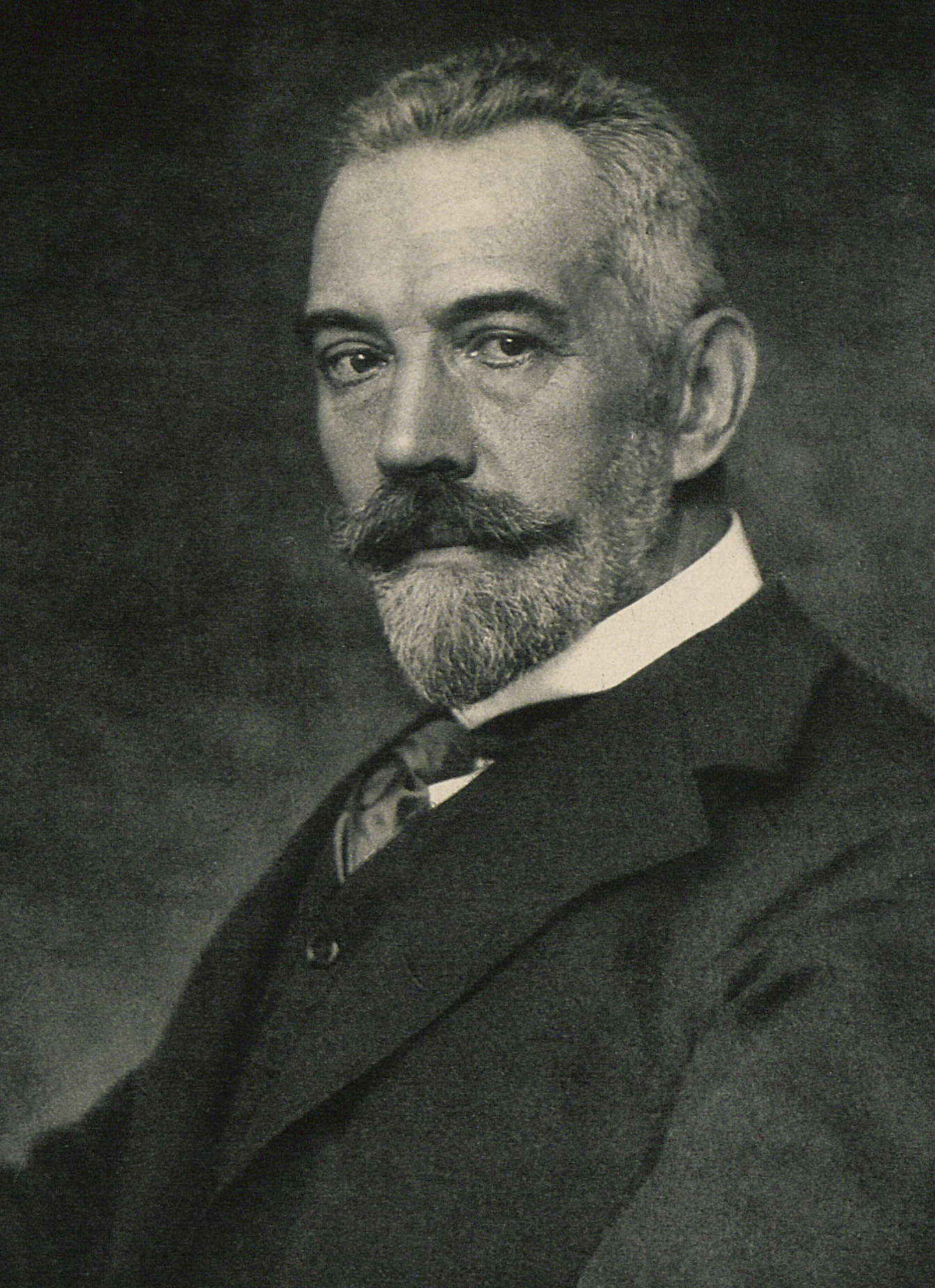
- Bethmann Hollweg in 1914

Chancellor of the German Empire
- In office 14 July 1909 – 13 July 1917
- Monarch: Wilhelm II
- Deputy: Clemens von Delbrück; Karl Helfferich
- Preceded by: Bernhard von Bülow
- Succeeded by: Georg Michaelis

Vice-Chancellor of Germany
- In office 24 June 1907 – 10 July 1909
- Chancellor: Bernhard von Bülow
- Preceded by: Arthur von Posadowsky-Wehner
- Succeeded by: Clemens von Delbrück

Personal details
- Born: Theobald Theodor Friedrich Alfred von Bethmann Hollweg; 29 November 1856 Hohenfinow, Kingdom of Prussia
- Died: 1 January 1921 (aged 64) Hohenfinow, Free State of Prussia, Germany
- Party: Independent
- Education: University of Leipzig; University of Strasbourg; University of Berlin
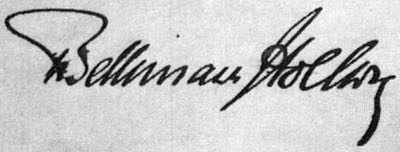
- Signature

Theobald Theodor Friedrich Alfred von Bethmann Hollweg (29 November 1856 – 1 January 1921) was a German politician who was imperial chancellor of the German Empire from 1909 to 1917. He oversaw the German entry into World War I and played a key role during its first three years. He was replaced as chancellor in July 1917 due in large part to opposition to his policies by leaders in the military.

Between 1884 and 1899 Bethmann Hollweg rose rapidly through positions in the Prussian government and served briefly as a member of the Reichstag in 1890. The experience left him unsympathetic to the party system and an independent for the remainder of his political life. Emperor Wilhelm II appointed him chancellor in 1909, in part because he approved of his conciliatory political style. His eight years as chancellor showed him to be cautiously supportive of some liberalization but also a firm believer that a parliamentary monarchy was the best form of government for Germany.

During World War I, Bethmann Hollweg thought that Germany was so threatened that it needed to take all necessary measures to survive. He assured Austria-Hungary of Germany's full backing and supported its aggressive demands against Serbia. He held back on German mobilization until after Russia's so that Germany would not appear to be the aggressor. Although he supported the invasion of Belgium as necessary given Germany's threatened position, he saw it from the first as an injustice that would need to be righted. He fought against the implementation of unrestricted submarine warfare but in the end bowed to pressure from the military and the conservatives in the Reichstag and approved its use. As the war progressed, many who had supported him in parliament felt that he had been in his position too long to be able to negotiate an acceptable peace. When both Quartermaster General Erich Ludendorff and Chief of the General Staff Paul von Hindenburg threatened to resign if he was not replaced as chancellor, Bethmann Hollweg submitted his resignation to the Emperor.

In his Reflections on the World War that remained unfinished when he died in 1921, Bethmann Hollweg stressed Germany's difficult geographical position, admitted that the government and the Emperor had made mistakes leading up to the war and that Germany bore some of the guilt for it but that only a "common guilt" could have led to such a great catastrophe.

== Early life and career ==
=== Family and education ===
Theobald von Bethmann Hollweg was born at Hohenfinow in Brandenburg, then part of the Kingdom of Prussia. He was the son of Prussian official Felix von Bethmann Hollweg. His grandfather August von Bethmann-Hollweg had been a prominent law scholar, president of Frederick William University in Berlin and Prussian minister of culture. His great-grandfather Johann Jakob Hollweg had married a daughter of the wealthy Frankfurt am Main banking family of Bethmann. His mother, Isabella de Rougemont, was a French Swiss and his grandmother Auguste Wilhelmine Gebser came from the Prussian noble family of Gebesee.

He was educated at the Schulpforta boarding school in the Prussian province of Saxony and studied law at the Universities of Strasbourg and Leipzig and at the Humboldt University of Berlin from 1875 to 1879. He then served as a one-year volunteer in the military before entering on his career path.

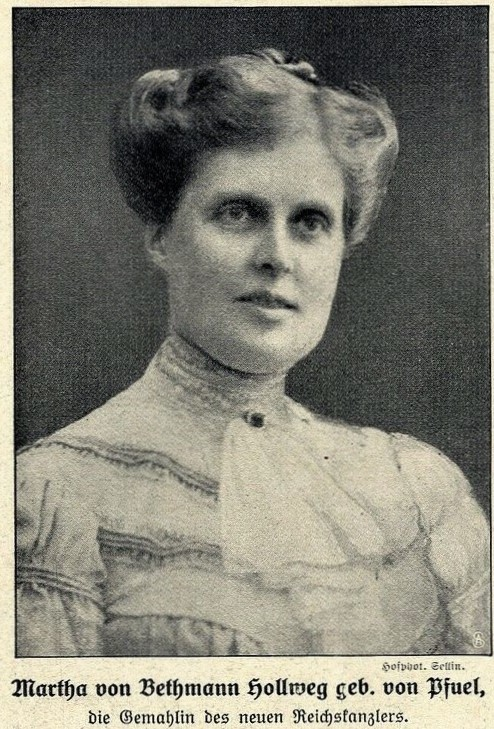
Martha von Bethmann Hollweg in 1909

On 17 June 1889 Bethmann Hollweg married Martha von Pfuel, the niece of Prussian Minister President Ernst von Pfuel. The marriage produced four children, one of whom died young. Their oldest son August Friedrich was killed on the eastern front on 9 December 1914.

=== District administrator and provincial governor ===
Bethmann Hollweg began his career as a royal government assessor in December 1884. The next year, after his father expressed the wish to give up his post as district administrator (Landrat), Theobald took over the office on an interim basis and in January 1886 secured it by official appointment. At the age of 29, he became the youngest district administrator in the province of Brandenburg.

While Bethmann Hollweg's father had conducted his office in the more autocratic style of the Prussian landed Junkers, Theobald drove to the villages and spoke with both landlords and workers. His work was based on the principle of voluntary participation by the bourgeoisie rather than on authoritarian instructions. The approach made him one of the most progressive district administrators of his time.

A coalition of three parties put Bethmann Hollweg forward as a joint candidate for the 1890 Reichstag election. He won by a majority of one vote, but protests by opposing candidates over alleged irregularities led to a new election in which Bethmann Hollweg did not participate. It was the end of his brief career both as a member of the Reichstag for the Free Conservative Party and as a party politician. For the remainder of his life he was an independent and unsympathetic to the party system.

In 1896, after ten years as a district administrator, he received two rapid promotions and then in 1899, at the age of 43, became the youngest provincial governor (Oberpräsident) in Prussia as the head the province of Brandenburg. His rapid professional success had been made possible by his talent for statesmanship, his grandfather's prestige, and by the intercession of Reich Chancellor Chlodwig zu Hohenlohe-Schillingsfürst, who had been watching his rise for some time.

=== Prussian minister of the interior ===
On 21 March 1905 Bethmann Hollweg was appointed Prussian minister of the interior. He accepted the task only reluctantly, as he held views that "did not fit into Prussian schematism". Noting early on the slow drifting apart of Wilhelmine society into an increasingly nationalistic, militaristic right and an increasingly radical republican left, he tried to steer a conciliatory course in domestic policy. He wanted, as he himself often said, to find a "policy of the diagonal" between Germany's conservative and liberal-radical currents. To the newly appointed Chief of the Reich Chancellery he wrote:

The elements to be reconciled no longer have any inner relationship on which to base mutual political views. They stand with respect to each other like members of different worlds. Hopefully you will succeed in having a balancing effect, for without gradual assimilation we will arrive at conditions that are quite untenable.

His focus early on was directed at the Social Democratic Party's commitment to the existing state structure. In his inaugural speech in the Prussian House of Representatives on 6 April 1905, on the subject of the left's proposal for the creation of a people's welfare office, he described public welfare as "the most important and serious task of the present day". Bethmann Hollweg promised to consider the application thoroughly and sympathetically, pointing out that "liberation from bureaucratic fetters is only possible with the free participation of all circles of the people". When the House dealt with the question of Prussia's three-class franchise that weighted votes by amount of taxes paid, Bethmann Hollweg opposed Prussia's adoption of the national Reichstag's universal manhood suffrage. He warned against "democratic egalitarianism" but praised the "tremendous aspirations of our working class".

In the same year, Polish-speaking schoolchildren in the Province of Posen, supported by the Catholic clergy, went on strike demanding that religion lessons be given in Polish again. The conservatives wanted to increase military presence in the province but Bethmann Hollweg rejected the idea. Instead he authorized that in the future religious instruction be given in Polish.

=== Reich state secretary of the interior ===
Bethmann Hollweg was appointed state secretary of the interior by Chancellor Bernhard von Bülow immediately after the 1907 Reichstag elections. Bethmann Hollweg was again reluctant to take on the post, but since he viewed the appointment as an imperial order, he ultimately saw no alternative but to accept.

In October 1907 he attended the German Workers' Congress, a general meeting of Christian trade unions, where the appearance of an imperial state secretary was seen as a major step forward.

In December he opposed the creation of a Reich labor office but rejected the claim that in sociopolitical matters the government would not act. "I have never discovered even a trace of tired skepticism in this activity; in it, albeit far removed from the parliamentary arena, our present-day Germany has been formed." He felt that the "searching and groping for the new takes place among the people themselves, not among the people's representatives". It was therefore necessary to "make room for the new views that have emerged from the changed economic and social conditions".

On Bethmann Hollweg's advice, the Emperor announced electoral reform in the Kingdom of Prussia in his speech from the throne of 20 October 1908. (The Prussian electoral system was in fact not finally reformed until 12 November 1918.) Wilhelm II promised "organic further development", which he described as one of the "most important tasks of the present". Reichstag deputy Friedrich Naumann, who liked the state secretary's style, later particularly emphasized Bethmann Hollweg's positive influence on the Emperor.

== Reich chancellor ==
=== Appointment and reactions ===
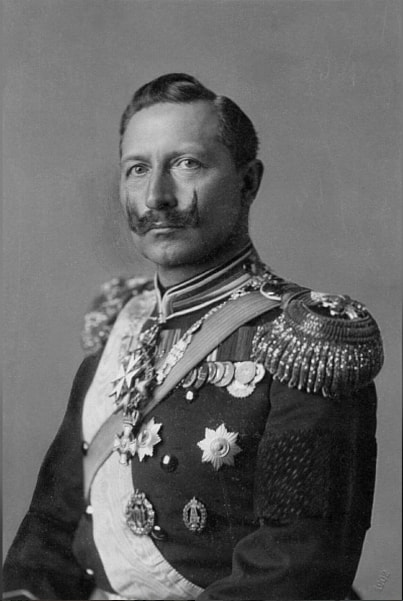
Emperor Wilhelm II in 1904

Emperor Wilhelm II appointed Bethmann Hollweg Reich chancellor on 7 July 1909. He had been deputy to Chancellor von Bülow during his time in office, and the Emperor knew Bethmann Hollweg's willingness to compromise in order to calm the rivalry between parties. His modest appearance and successes as an advisor to Wilhelm had also put him in the Emperor's good graces. Bethmann Hollweg's appointment had previously been suggested in political circles, including by Friedrich von Holstein in the Foreign Office.

Overall there was a positive response from all parties to the appointment, although the Catholic Centre Party had reservations, and for the Social Democratic Party (SPD) Bethmann Hollweg represented just another chancellor loyal to the Emperor. But the benevolent neutrality of the overall party spectrum resulted from Bethmann Hollweg's many facets. He was not a Junker in the true sense of the word, which the leftists took as a positive sign. His family history made him appreciated by the National Liberals and the Centre, and his activity as an administrative official had created trust among conservatives.

The response from abroad was exclusively friendly. The French Journal des Débats spoke of a "reassuring sign" for Franco-German relations. The French ambassador in Berlin, Jules Cambon, sent the new Reich chancellor an official letter of congratulations, something that had never happened before. The German Embassy in London under Paul Wolff Metternich wrote that British King Edward VII considered the new chancellor an "important partner for the maintenance of peace".

=== Domestic policy ===
In January 1910 Bethmann Hollweg wrote that the government faced the "great task of the political education of the people, eliminating the rule of slogans and superficial evaluations". He saw the basic task of a statesman as a "kind of listening to developments". In 1910 he submitted a bill to reform Prussia's three-class electoral law, but it was rejected by the Prussian state parliament (Landtag). In the Reichstag he pushed forward the reform of the constitutional status of Alsace–Lorraine, which had been taken from France after its defeat in the 1870–1871 Franco-Prussian War. It was given its own constitution with a bicameral parliament, the lower house of which was elected under Reichstag suffrage (universal manhood suffrage). The Reich Chancellor's bill was adopted on 23 March 1911 in the face of strong protests from conservatives and the military. Unlike in Prussia, Bethmann Hollweg was not opposed by any influential conservatives, which allowed his democratic constitutional initiative to pass.

=== Foreign policy ===
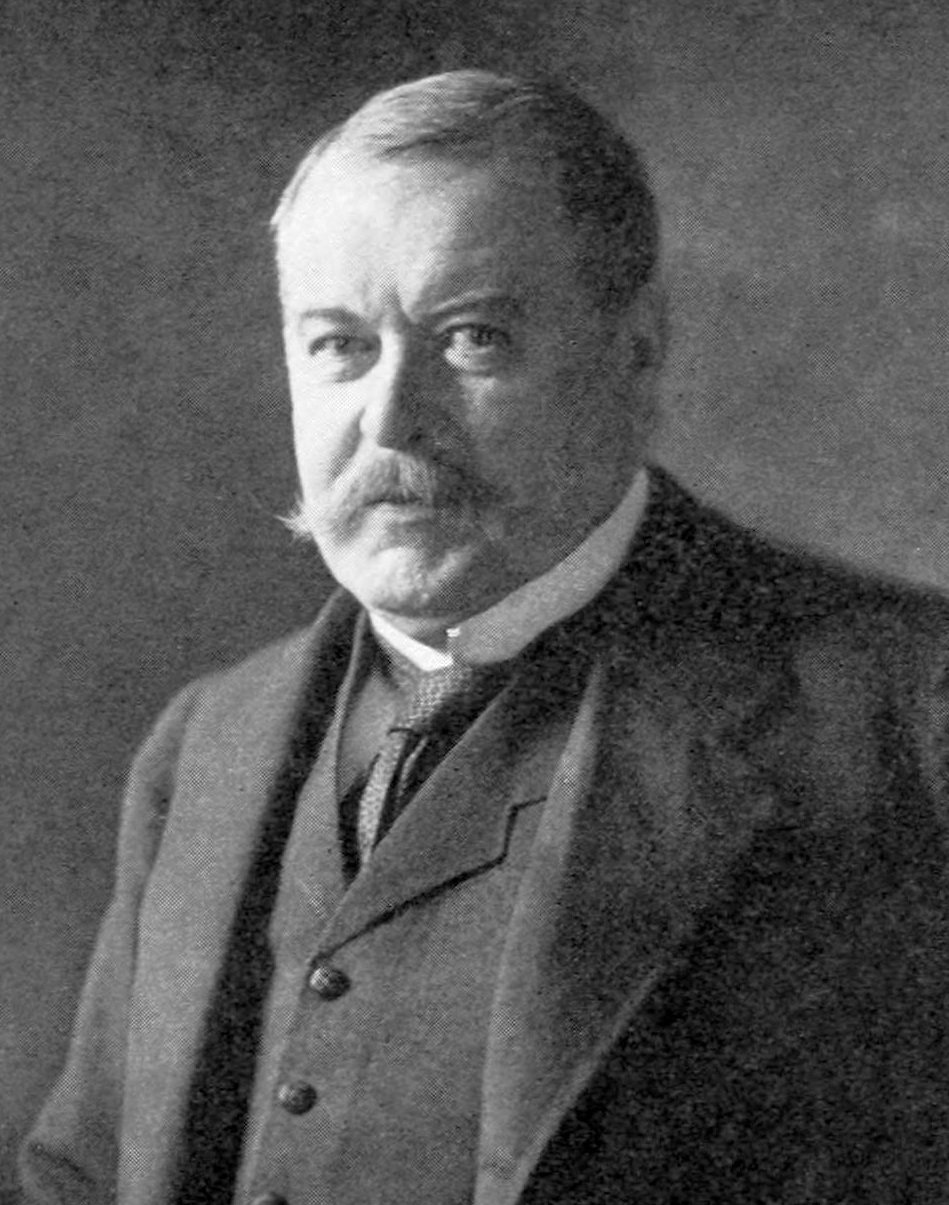
Alfred von Kiderlen-Waechter

In foreign policy Bethmann Hollweg from the beginning attached great importance to an understanding with Great Britain. He considered German-Austrian relations to be so problem-free that he thought it more important to prove friendly to the other powers. He appointed Alfred von Kiderlen-Waechter as state secretary for foreign affairs. It was initially seen as a good appointment but later proved to be a disappointment. The impulsive Swabian contrasted with the Reich Chancellor not only in his temperament but above all in foreign policy matters. Although Wilhelm II had called for the Empire to increase its advocacy of "peaceful and friendly relations with the other powers" in his 1909 speech from the throne, Kiderlen-Waechter's diplomacy in connection with the 1911 Second Moroccan Crisis – when he sent a German gunboat to the African nation over which France had political control – was not in keeping with the Emperor's words. Bethmann Hollweg was often reproached for his passivity during the crisis. The fact that he gave Kiderlen-Waechter a free hand in spite of his misgivings about his approach can be explained by his feeling that he lacked expertise in foreign policy and did not consider himself competent to stand up to Kiderlen-Waechter on the Morocco issue.

The Morocco crisis was settled with a Franco-German agreement in which the Empire relinquished its claims to Morocco in return for New Cameroon (Neukamerun), a land extension of German Cameroon (Kamerun). Conservative Colonial State Secretary Friedrich von Lindequist protested strongly and resigned in November 1911. Instead of appointing the successor Lindequist proposed, Bethmann Hollweg chose the liberal governor of Samoa, Wilhelm Solf. Solf was one of the few foreign policy makers in the Empire to fully support Bethmann Hollweg.

German-Russian relations had moved in a positive direction before the Moroccan crisis. In 1910 Tsar Nicholas II had been in Potsdam, which Bethmann Hollweg described in a letter as a "stepping stone to an understanding with England". According to records of the Russian court, the Tsar saw a belligerent involvement with Germany as "receding into the far distance". In 1912 the Reich Chancellor took advantage of a meeting between the Emperor and the Tsar in Baltischport (now Paldiski, Estonia) for a friendly discussion. After talks with Russian Prime Minister Vladimir Kokovtsov and Foreign Minister Sergey Sazonov, Bethmann Hollweg wrote that he had been able to establish "trusting and friendly relations". On 25 July 1912 Walther Rathenau stayed at Hohenfinow to talk to the Chancellor about his trip to Russia. Rathenau noted in his diary that Bethmann Hollweg wanted to "maintain the modus vivendi in the Russian question as well". In foreign policy matters, Rathenau proposed to Bethmann Hollweg a European customs union, a halt to British imperialism in the Mediterranean, then an alliance with Great Britain for the purpose of understanding and colonial acquisitions for Germany. The ideas were not the Chancellor's, but he signed the list of proposals with "generally agreed".

Bethmann Hollweg's second foreign policy problem was the expansion of the German fleet that Admiral Alfred von Tirpitz wanted. The Chancellor intended to use dialogue with the United Kingdom to facilitate a cautious expansion of the fleet and at the same time to improve relations through honesty. Due to threatening speeches by German conservatives in the Reichstag and British conservatives in the Houses of Parliament, the efforts were unsuccessful.

In the 1912 Haldane Mission – an attempt by the British diplomat Richard Haldane to come to an agreement on the naval arms race between Great Britain and Germany – Bethmann Hollweg failed again to reach a settlement. Germany wanted Britain to pledge neutrality in any future war while Britain sought to slow down the two countries' race to expand their navies, which was becoming an increasing drain on the Exchequer. Bethmann Hollweg nevertheless enjoyed a good reputation with British Foreign Minister Sir Edward Grey: "So long as Bethmann Hollweg is chancellor, we will cooperate with Germany for the peace of Europe." Bethmann Hollweg negotiated treaties over an eventual partition of the Portuguese colonies and the projected Berlin–Baghdad railway, the latter aimed in part at securing the Balkan countries' support for a German alliance with the Ottoman Empire.

Although Bethmann Hollweg was critical of naval expansion, in April 1912 he pushed forward a Reichstag bill providing for a buildup of the army. A year later he submitted the next defense bill which asked for a 136,000 man increase in the army and almost 1.3 billion marks in additional funds for it and for arms purchases. The SPD spoke out vigorously against the military buildup. Bethmann Hollweg combined the bill with a cover bill that provided for an "extraordinary defense contribution" from all assets over 10,000 marks. Since the SPD had always called for direct taxes on the wealthy, it agreed to the bill after a contentious debate.

=== The Zabern Affair and censure by the Reichstag ===
In late 1913 the Zabern Affair shook German politics and public opinion. In Zabern (Saverne) in Alsace, a young German lieutenant insulted Alsatians in a speech to soldiers and called for rebellious Alsatians to be stabbed. He was only minimally held to account by his colonel, and after protests by Alsatians, the military had some citizens arrested illegally.

When Bethmann Hollweg declared in the Reichstag on 3 December 1913 that the Kaiser's uniform must be respected under all circumstances, he gave the impression that he was fully behind Minister of War Erich von Falkenhayn. The parties that had hitherto supported Bethmann Hollweg because of his progressive policies – the Centre, the Progressive People's Party, the National Liberals and the Social Democrats – united in introducing a motion of censure against him. When Philipp Scheidemann (SPD) pointed to the exemplary constitutional conditions in Great Britain and the Netherlands, Bethmann Hollweg responded with dismissive, angry heckling. The Chancellor of the center seemed to have moved to the right even though he was reviled as a democrat in national-conservative circles. In his Reichstag speech, he had spoken against his convictions in order to preserve the neutrality of the government and to underpin his loyalty to the Emperor. Ultimately, though, he had given in to the military and fallen into a position of weakness. For the first time he confessed that he regretted not having a party behind him.

=== From the "blank check" to the outbreak of war ===
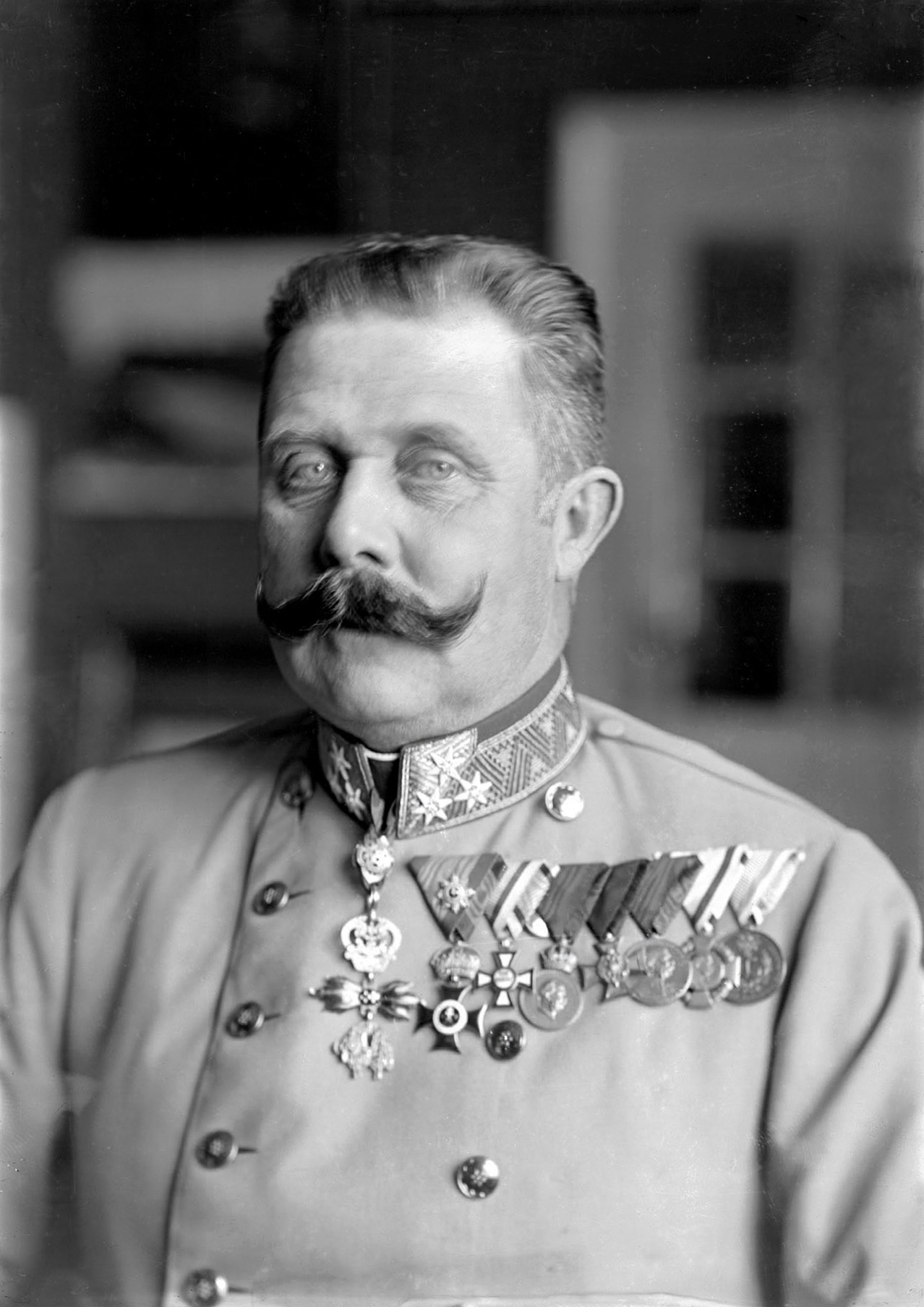
Archduke Franz Ferdinand, heir presumptive to the throne of Austria-Hungary

At the turn of the year 1913/1914, the European atmosphere had calmed, and Bethmann Hollweg felt a new optimism in foreign policy. It seemed to him that the Treaty of Bucharest, which concluded the Second Balkan War, had solved the problems in the Balkans in the medium term, and a recent exchange of letters with Russian Foreign Minister Sergey Sazonov had stabilized the situation in the east. The diplomatic crisis over the 1913 German military mission to the Ottoman Empire had been overcome in spite of the pan-Slav sentiment in the Russian Empire.

The Reich Chancellor's statements from the time reveal that he was anxious to prevent a major European war. Russia's actions in northern Persia also brought Britain temporarily closer to Germany. When in the early summer of 1914 the German government learned of a British-Russian naval agreement, it cast a shadow over Bethmann Hollweg's foreign policy. Disappointed in his confidence in British Foreign Minister Edward Grey, he wrote to the German embassy in Constantinople that it was a matter of muddling through without any major conflicts. A few days later, after a disagreement with the Chief of the Army's General Staff Helmuth von Moltke, he left for a summer vacation at his home in Hohenfinow. It was abruptly ended shortly after his arrival by the assassination of Archduke Franz Ferdinand of Austria-Hungary on 28 June 1914.

After the assassination of the presumptive heir to the Austro-Hungarian throne, Wilhelm II issued the famous "blank check" to László Szőgyény, Austria-Hungary's ambassador in Berlin. It affirmed that Germany would uphold its alliance obligations with Austria-Hungary and stand at its side. Bethmann Hollweg later wrote in his Reflections on the World War that "the Emperor's views coincided" with his own. On 6 July 1914, during the July Crisis that led up to the outbreak of World War I, the Reich Chancellor again assured the Austrian embassy that Germany would fight faithfully alongside its ally. Austria-Hungary's aggressive demands against Serbia thus took place with Bethmann Hollweg's backing.

At the same time, he had State Secretary of the Foreign Office Gottlieb von Jagow telegraph Prince Lichnowsky, the German ambassador in London, that "everything must be avoided that could give the appearance that we are inciting the Austrians to war". Thinking that he could localize the conflict, Bethmann Hollweg endorsed the continuation of the Emperor's absence aboard his yacht. The Chancellor gave Austria a free hand, although not without criticism, as the French ambassador in Vienna testified. His confidant Kurt Riezler noted that Bethmann Hollweg expressed early fears that if Austria adopted too expansionist a tone, the conflict could no longer be contained in the Balkans and "could lead to world war".

Even when the Foreign Office finally knew in July 1914 that Austria-Hungary's ultimatum to Serbia was to be formulated in a way that Serbia could not accept, the Chancellor let the Austrians have their way. The Reich Chancellery stated when asked, "We cannot comment on the formulation of the demands to Serbia, since it is Austria's affair." Believing in Great Britain's neutrality, Bethmann Hollweg telegraphed to the London Foreign Office: "Since Austria is safeguarding vital interests in its action, any interference by Germany as its ally is out of the question. ... Only if forced will we take up the sword."

Serbia's reply to the Austrian ultimatum accepted almost all of Austria-Hungary's demands. When it arrived in Berlin on 27 July 1914, the Emperor saw no need for war. He suggested that Austria should occupy Belgrade with the aim of furthering negotiations towards a permanent solution to the Balkan question. Bethmann Hollweg, seeing the threat of British entry into the war, briefly advocated the halt-in-Belgrade proposal combined with Austrian renunciation of annexation of Serbia. But he knew that it would be considered unsatisfactory by the Russians. When the Emperor "threatened to weaken again", the Chancellor and the Foreign Office undermined the proposal calling for restraint by forwarding the letter from the German ambassador in London belatedly and not entirely correctly to Vienna. The last (here italicized) sentence was deleted before it was sent:

If we rejected every attempt at mediation, the whole world would hold us responsible for the conflagration and represent us as the real warmongers. That would also make our position impossible here in Germany, where we have got to appear as though the war had been forced on us. Our position is the more difficult because Serbia seems to have given way very extensively. We cannot therefore reject the role of mediator; we have to pass the British proposal on to Vienna for consideration, especially since London and Paris are continuously using their influence on Petersburg. AIso, the whole world here is convinced, and I hear the same from my colleagues, that the key to the situation lies in Berlin, and that if Berlin seriously wants peace, it will prevent Vienna from following a foolhardy policy.

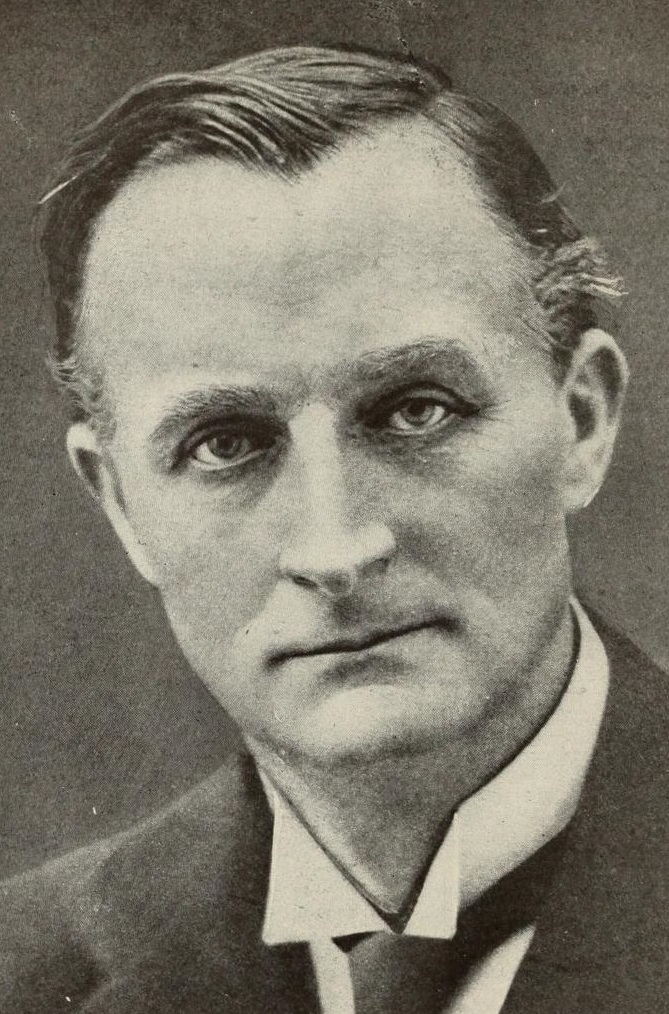
Sir Edward Grey

At the same time, Italy, a supposed ally of the Triple Alliance, demanded compensation for Austria's actions in the Balkans. Vienna responded by offering to divide Serbia between Russia, which had not previously made any territorial claims in Serbia, and Austria. The proposal was rejected with loud protest in Berlin. For the first time Bethmann Hollweg was openly furious at the Danube monarchy and telegraphed his views to the foreign office.

British Foreign Secretary Grey warned Germany that if the conflict was not limited to Austria and Russia but also involved France and the Reich, Britain could not stand aside either. Bethmann Hollweg then informed the German ambassador in Vienna that Austria should not resist negotiations with the Russian Empire. Although Germany was prepared to fulfill its alliance obligation, it was not prepared to be "recklessly dragged ... into a world conflagration".

Meanwhile, the military of Austria-Hungary and Russia were on the move, and Chief of the General Staff Moltke called for the Chancellor to initiate German general mobilization. Austria must not be abandoned, he said. The General Staff's strategic route through Belgium (a key part of the Schlieffen Plan for the German attack on France) ultimately undermined all of Bethmann Hollweg's efforts to localize the conflict. In his memoirs, Admiral Tirpitz described the Chancellor's situation in those days as that of a "drowning man".

=== World War I ===
==== Outbreak ====
Germany declared war on Russia and began mobilization on 1 August 1914. Bethmann Hollweg, in contrast to representatives of the Prussian Ministry of War, had insisted on formal declarations in order "to have affirmation under international law". His profound desire for guidelines in the war that were always applicable was met with surprise in Berlin. He rejected the Tsar's proposal to bring the Serbian question before the Permanent Court of Arbitration in The Hague because Russian general mobilization had already taken place the day before. Waiting to mobilize until after Russia had done so allowed the German government to claim that it was the victim of Russian aggression and won it the support of the Social Democrats for most of the war.

On 3 August Bethmann Hollweg assured British Foreign Minister Grey that the Russian mobilization of 30 July was what had put Germany in such straits that it had demanded that Belgium allow its troops to pass through the country. He had tried everything, he said, to avoid the breach of international law and to prevent "the madness of the self-destruction of Europe's nations of culture [Kulturnationen]".

On 4 August German troops invaded Belgium. While awaiting the British declaration of war, Bethmann Hollweg appeared before the Reichstag to stress that Germany had not wanted the war and that the Russian military had ignited the blaze. The "injustice to Belgium" must be righted by the Empire, he said, but those who were so threatened could think only of how to cut their way through.

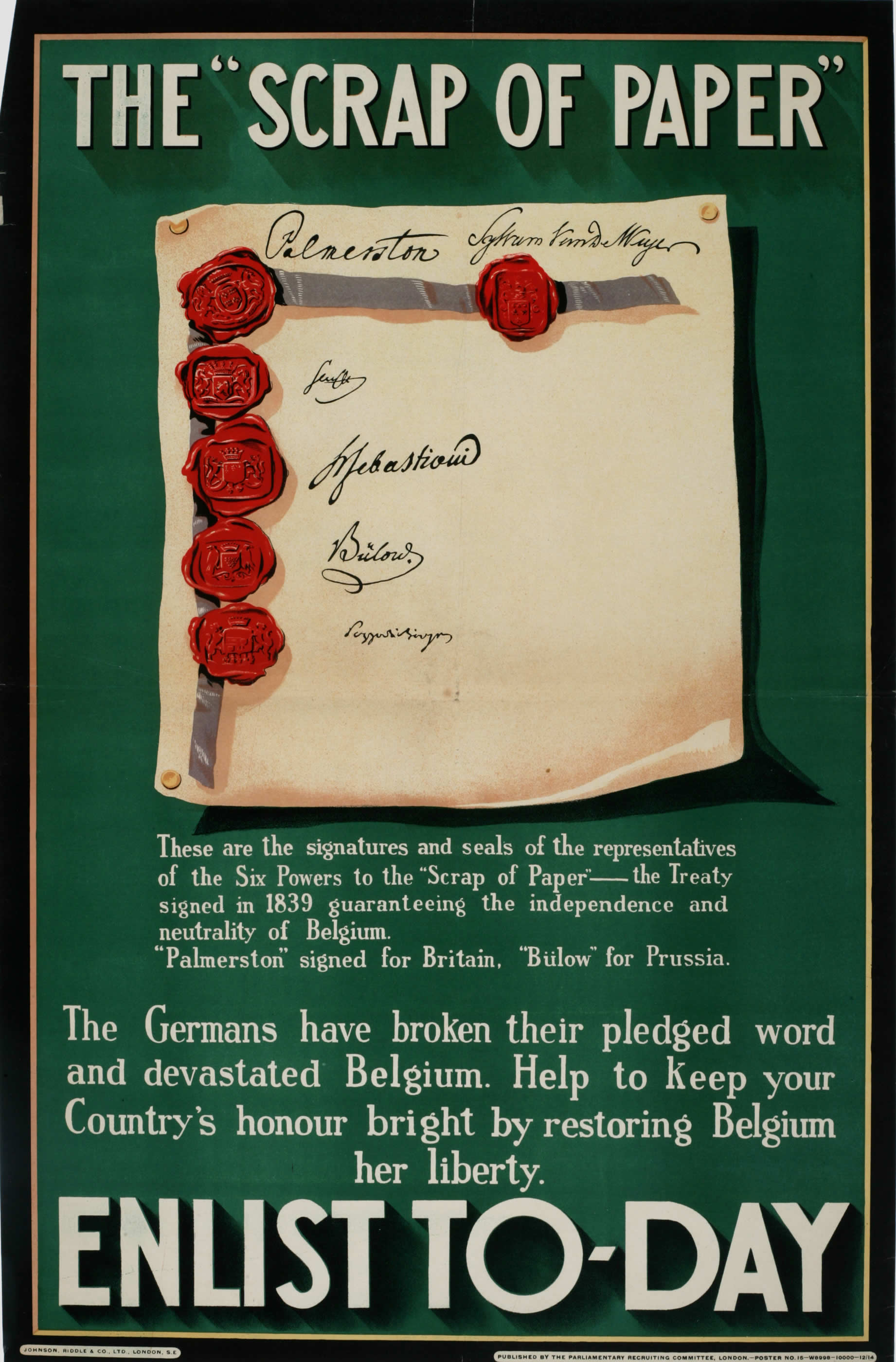
British enlistment poster capitalizing on Bethmann Hollweg's "faux pas" in calling the treaty ensuring Belgium's neutrality a "scrap of paper"

He had a conversation with the British ambassador to Germany Sir Edward Goschen on the evening of 4 August. In tears the Chancellor poured out his soul to him. For a "scrap of paper" (meaning the 1839 Treaty of London guaranteeing Belgium's neutrality), he said, Britain wanted to wage war against a kindred nation that wished to live in peace with it. All efforts had collapsed before his eyes like a house of cards. In the end the Reich Chancellor and ambassador are said to have been weeping in each other's arms. In his Reflections on the World War Bethmann Hollweg conceded that saying "scrap of paper" had been a faux pas (Entgleisung, lit. 'derailment'), but he held to his opinion that Belgian neutrality was as nothing compared to the approaching world war.

==== 1914: early reactions ====
Bethmann Hollweg remained largely unaffected by the patriotic enthusiasm in Germany in August 1914 (the so-called "spirit of 1914"). A letter he sent to his friend Wolfgang von Oettingen on 30 August 1914 bears witness: "Work and hope have been sundered in my hands. But I feel innocent of the rivers of blood that now flow. Our people [Volk] is glorious and cannot perish."

In what would later be called the September Program, the Empire formulated concrete war aims for the first time. The program contained demands for territory in Europe directed primarily against Russia, as well as the creation of a European customs union that would smooth the way for German economic interests in neighboring countries and secure German supremacy in central Europe. Whether or not the plans originated with Bethmann Hollweg cannot be proven. His associate Kurt Riezler is generally considered to have been the author. Riezler wrote on 20 September 1914 that the Chancellor would "never do more than listen on the issue of war aims." Nevertheless, Bethmann Hollweg signed the September Program.

Bethmann Hollweg admitted in 1918 that demanding the restoration of Belgium would probably have been the best thing to do. But under the enormous pressure coming from the military, which was clamoring for annexations ("That cursed sentiment at Headquarters"), it was not possible at the time, he said, and politics, as Otto von Bismarck had remarked, was the art of the possible.

Instead the Chancellor spoke of a "pledge" (Faustpfand) to Belgium and France. For him the formulation had the advantage that it did not lead to a premature commitment, since the question of redeeming the pledge would arise only at the end of the war. It was thus a rhetorical weapon against annexationist claims. Bethmann Hollweg probably never retracted his 4 August 1914 statement admitting guilt for the "injustice to Belgium", although some historians think he did. In May 1917 he told his friend Karl von Weizsäcker that he had wanted to bind the Social Democrats to the Empire with both formulations ("pledge" and "injustice to Belgium"). Before the Weimar National Assembly's committee of inquiry on the question of war guilt in 1919, he stressed that he had never revoked the confession of wrongdoing.

At all times Bethmann Hollweg emphasized the defensive character he believed the war had. He always spoke of "securing" the Reich and, in the event of victory, of a "stronger Germany" – but never of a "larger one", as a member of the Pan-German League remarked disapprovingly. Although Bethmann Hollweg spoke at Headquarters in March 1915 of the liberation of Belgium, he could not meet the demands of the left, which was insisting on a statement of total renunciation, and still continue to be sure of the goodwill of Wilhelm II.

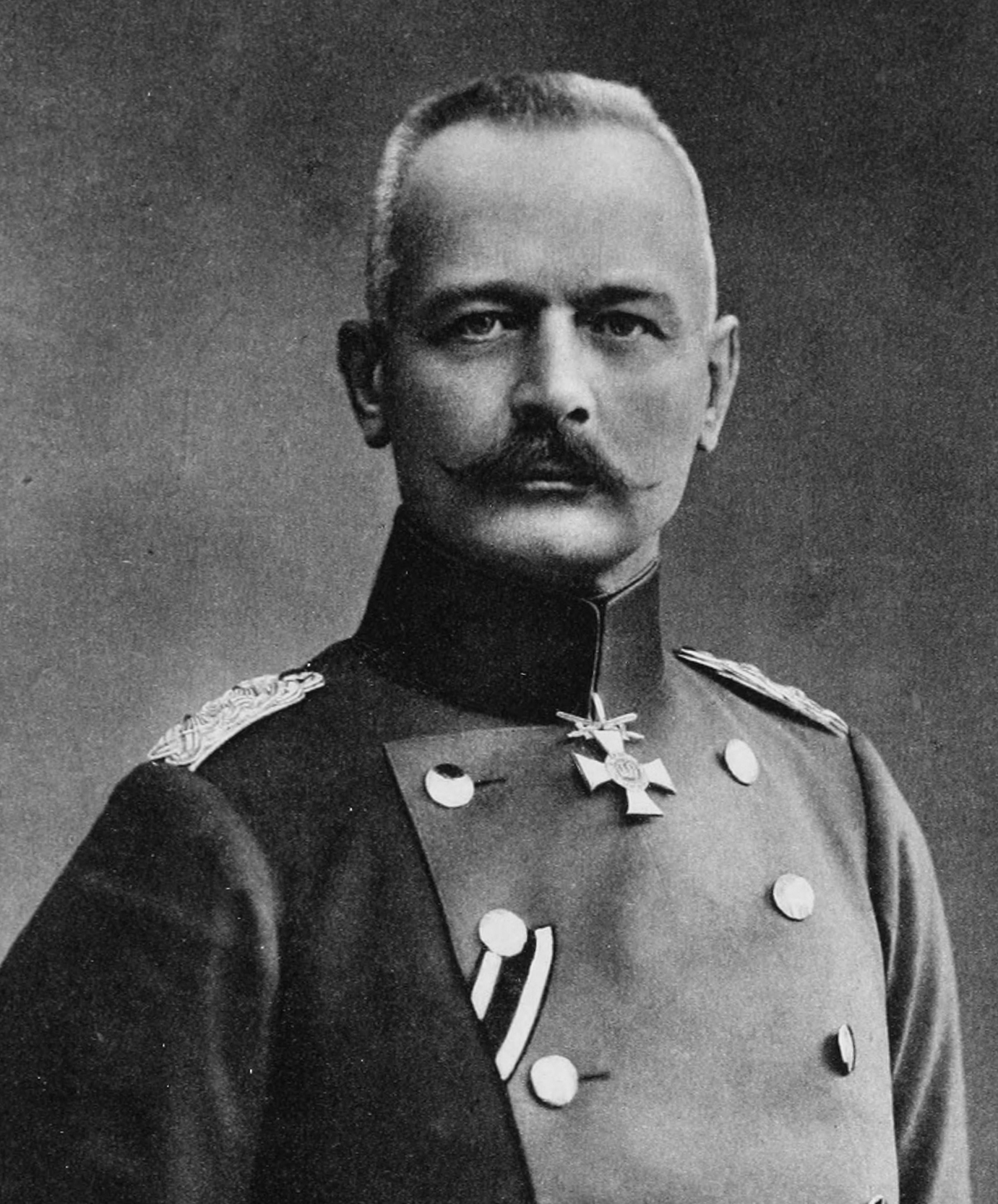
Erich von Falkenhayn

Another problem proved to be informing the people of the military situation. As early as September 1914, Chief of the General Staff Erich von Falkenhayn had called for systematic public education about the unfavorable military situation resulting from the First Battle of the Marne. On the advice of the Foreign Office, which feared unpredictable consequences abroad, and of several business associations, Bethmann Hollweg refused to allow the government to disseminate the military truth. In spite of all self-deception, he said, education could happen "only gradually through events themselves". Confidence in victory was, after all, a "moral factor of tremendous importance".

While the National Liberals, unaware of the true situation on the front, moved more and more to the right and indulged in ideas of annexations, Bethmann Hollweg noted that partisanship for major territorial demands largely coincided with opposition to suffrage reform in Prussia. Foreign policy issues had an internal political side, something that was to prove a decisive, deep-seated problem for the Chancellor and the Empire.

From the beginning of the war, the Reichstag operated under Burgfriedenspolitik, a political truce between the parties and the government. It was based in large part on the work of the Chancellor. He had rejected the plan of leading military officers such as Admiral Tirpitz to arrest the SPD executive committee at the start of the war and to dissolve the party. Bethmann Hollweg had in fact openly approached the Social Democrats in order to win them over to the Emperor and the Empire for the long term.

When he asked the SPD on 29 July 1914 what its position would be in the war, he was assured that he would not have to assume that there would be either sabotage or general strikes. After he had presented the SPD executive committee's letter to the Emperor, Wilhelm spoke in the Reichstag on 4 August, using words that were to become famous: "I no longer know any parties or denominations; today we are all German brothers and only German brothers."

In retrospect, Bethmann Hollweg saw the day the war began as one of the greatest in German history. On 4 August, he thought, the internal barriers that had prevented the country from growing together into a true nation-state had fallen. At the beginning of October 1914 he said, "The barriers must fall, a new era will begin after the war. The differences of class have receded as never before." Only in the following weeks did he begin to realize that the conservatives, "sitting there so icily", did not want to join the new community that spanned all world views.

==== 1915–1916: annexationists and the sinking of the Lusitania ====
In February 1915 the government committed itself to a "reorientation" that was to include electoral reform in Prussia. Bethmann Hollweg said that Prussia's three-class franchise had "become impossible" and that it was necessary to move to equal manhood suffrage. Bethmann Hollweg was accused at the time by both the left and the right of weakness in decision-making. The lack of a political center became increasingly apparent. It would have had to rely above all on the National Liberals, who under their annexationist spokesmen Ernst Bassermann and Gustav Stresemann did not consider cooperating with the left-liberal progressives standing behind Bethmann Hollweg.

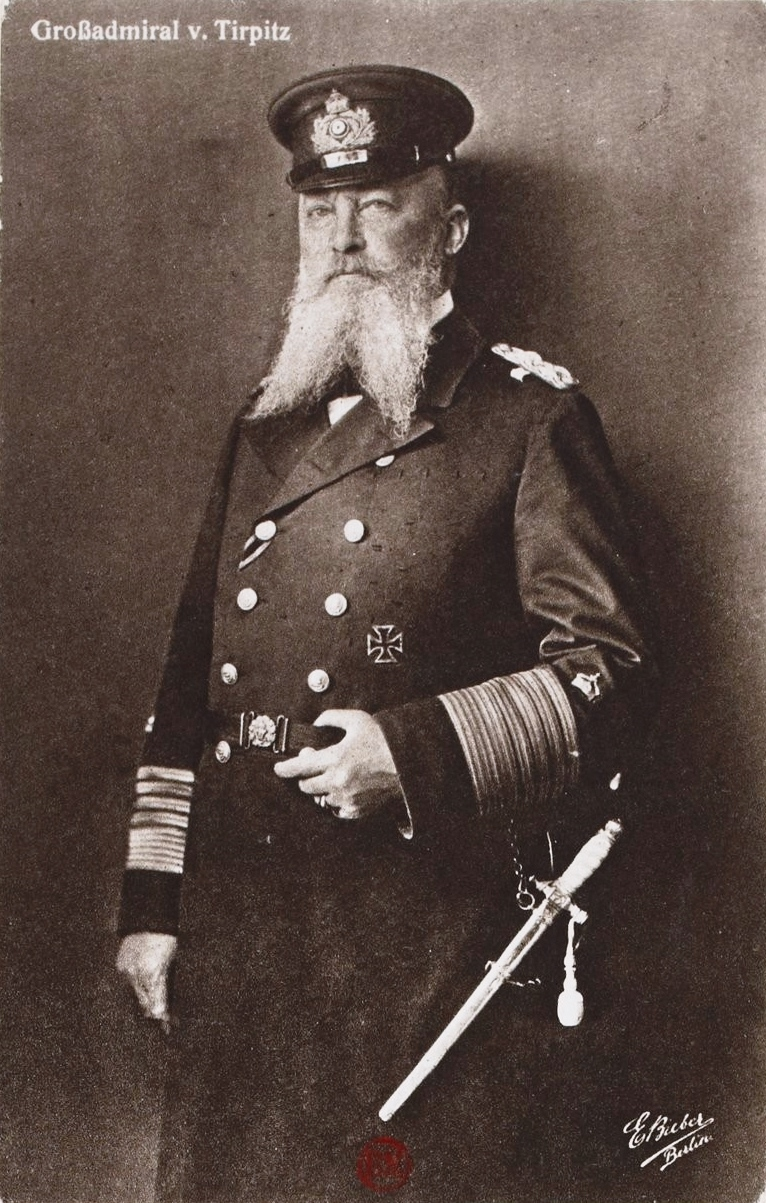
Grand Admiral Alfred von Tirpitz

Probably at the instigation of Alfred von Tirpitz, whom he admired, Frederick Augustus II, Grand Duke of Oldenburg, as a spokesman for the annexationists, suggested to King Ludwig III of Bavaria in March 1915 that he demand from Wilhelm II, on behalf of the German princes, the dismissal of Bethmann Hollweg, who in his opinion was too weak and stood in the way of a "German peace". Ludwig, who wanted to enlarge Bavaria after a victory, did not do so because Georg von Hertling, the chairman of the Bavarian Council of Ministers and future Reich chancellor (1917–1918), was able to prevent it.

The Chancellor showed a clear view of the Reich's military situation in the spring of 1915 in an unusual proposal he made to the Prussian Ministry of State. He suggested that two districts in Silesia (a province of Prussia) be ceded to Austria so that it would be easier for the Danube monarchy to make territorial concessions to Italy. Bethmann Hollweg thought that it was the only way to prevent Italy from entering the war on the side of the Entente Powers, and that if it did, the war would be lost. His ministerial colleagues rejected the proposal as "un-Prussian". Italy declared war on Austria-Hungary on 23 May 1915.

On 7 May 1915 a German submarine torpedoed the British passenger ship RMS Lusitania off Ireland. The resulting deaths of over 120 Americans put a considerable strain on Germany's relations with the United States. The question of unrestricted submarine warfare once again came under discussion. In an interview in November 1914, Admiral Tirpitz had described submarine warfare as the only truly effective means to fight the naval blockade that the United Kingdom had imposed on Germany. Expecting that humanitarian arguments would carry little weight with the Admiralty, Bethmann Hollweg tried to avoid or at least delay unrestricted submarine warfare by asking critical questions. He doubted whether such military action aimed against the British war economy would be enough to decide the outcome of the war. He also feared early on that the United States would enter the war on the side of the Entente.

With the Lusitania sinking still a political issue, Bethmann Hollweg appeared before the Reichstag on 19 August 1915 and said, "We can use power – even externally – only in the interests of freedom." Considerations of power politics could nevertheless be more important than questions of moral principle. In the face of an increasing number of reports by German representatives in the Ottoman Empire of massacres of Armenians, and when even the ambassador in Constantinople called for intervention, the Chancellor noted, "Our only aim is to keep the Ottoman Empire at our side until the end of the war, regardless of whether Armenians perish over it or not."

In early March 1916 Bethmann Hollweg, using the threat of resignation, forced through the delay of unrestricted submarine warfare. Shortly afterwards Tirpitz tendered his own resignation, and it was accepted on 12 March. The Chancellor's greatest adversary and proponent of submarine warfare, which Bethmann Hollweg called a "crime against the German people", had been defeated.

The breakup of the SPD was to all appearances imminent in March 1916. During a Reichstag session, many Social Democrats had expressed their approval of Bethmann Hollweg. The moderate wing under Friedrich Ebert seemed to be breaking from the left wing of the party. SPD chairman Hugo Haase, who had spoken passionately in the Reichstag against the war's great bloodshed and the adoption of the emergency budget, was forced to resign and expelled from the SPD along with his supporters. Bethmann Hollweg hoped for a merger of the Social Democrats supporting his war policy and the Progressive People's Party to form a centrist party (a "party of the sensible"). Instead, the more radical and anti-war Independent Social Democratic Party (USPD) was formed in April 1917 with Haase at its head.

==== Hindenburg and Ludendorff ====
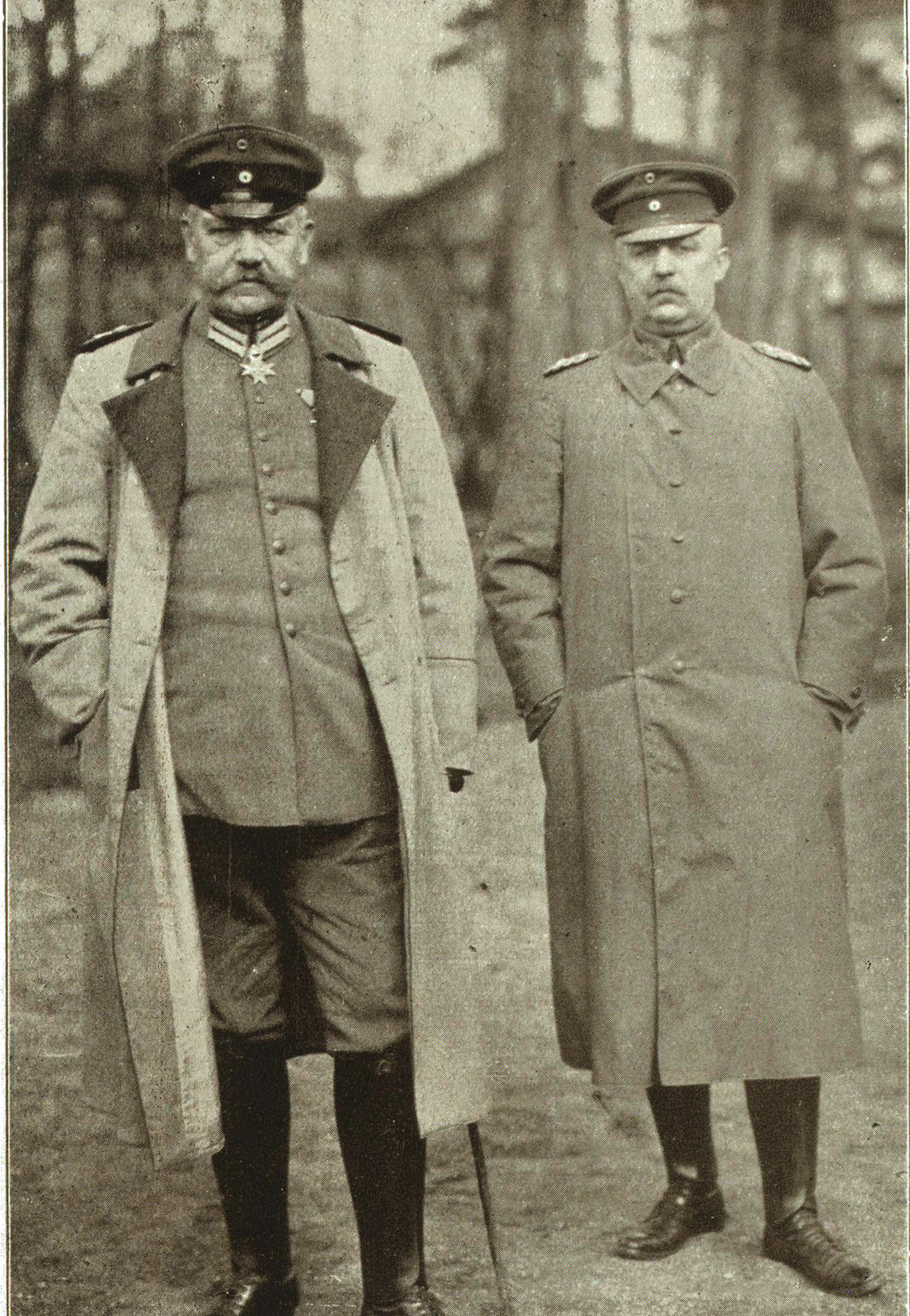
Paul von Hindenburg (left) and Erich Ludendorff

In July 1916 leading industrialists as well as government figures such as Walther Rathenau argued for transferring the Supreme Army Command (OHL) from Erich von Falkenhayn to Paul von Hindenburg and Erich Ludendorff and giving them dictatorial powers in the civilian sphere as well. Bethmann Hollweg supported the plan by publicly saying that the name Hindenburg was the terror of the enemy and by prevailing on the Emperor to give him command of the entire eastern front. On 28 August he convinced the Emperor to dismiss Falkenhayn, and the following day Wilhelm II appointed Hindenburg Chief of the General Staff of the Field Army and Ludendorff First Quartermaster General.

Early in the war Bethmann Hollweg had supported annexing the Polish Border Strip from Congress Poland in order to strengthen Germany's eastern border against Russia. The plan included removing ethnic Poles from the area and populating it with German settlers. The new Quartermaster General Ludendorff called for the immediate establishment of a pseudo-independent Kingdom of Poland as a "breeding station for people needed for further fighting in the east". In negotiations with Austrian Foreign Minister Stephan Burián von Rajecz in August 1916, the representatives of the Central Powers agreed on an independent constitutional kingdom of Poland, but under pressure from Bethmann Hollweg, it was not to be proclaimed until after the end of the war. On 18 October 1916, following protests from Vienna, the August agreement was declared invalid, and Poland's independence was brought forward to November. On 5 November 1916 the proclamation of the Regency Kingdom of Poland was announced.

Bethmann Hollweg had succumbed to pressure from the army command and the Danube monarchy. He was able to prevent forced levies, but the fact that the military began recruiting the first volunteers for the Polish armed forces immediately after the proclamation of Polish independence revealed Ludendorff's plans. Although the Chancellor was not the driving force in the Polish question, even openly resisting the OHL, he was ultimately politically responsible.

In the fall of 1916, the OHL, which was increasingly wielding more power in the Reich, drafted a law under the Hindenburg Programme called the Auxiliary Services Act. In order to increase Germany's industrial output, especially of weapons, it sought to militarize the economy by mobilizing all resources, both material and human, through the introduction of compulsory labor. The plan, especially its inclusion of women, caused widespread resistance among labor unions and the liberal and socialist parties in the Reichstag. As a result, the OHL was forced to make concessions that included arbitration committees, the expansion of trade unions' powers and a repeal of the act at the end of the war.

At the same time, at the insistence of the OHL, the deportation of Belgian workers to the Reich began. In spite of Bethmann Hollweg's appeal to carefully consider the question of forced laborers, the coercive measures continued until February 1917.

==== 1916–1917: peace initiatives and submarine warfare ====
On 7 October 1916 the Centre Party passed a resolution in which it came around to the military's position and for the first time called for unrestricted submarine warfare. Bethmann Hollweg later wrote in his Reflections that parliament had completely surrendered political power to the OHL.

In the Ministry of State on 20 October 1916, the Chancellor proposed a separate peace offer by the Central Powers, citing the absence of a tangible initiative by the United States and the support of Austrian Foreign Minister Burián. He had in mind the restoration, as far as possible, of the pre-war situation. In mid-November 1916 Bethmann Hollweg sent an inquiry to Washington through Ambassador Johann Heinrich von Bernstorff about the prospect of a peace conference. But when the White House continued to show indecision, Bethmann Hollweg saw perhaps the last chance for a peace of reconciliation (Ausgleichsfrieden) in an offer of his own.

After the victory over Romania, when the military situation had changed in favor of the Empire, the Chancellor, speaking in the Reichstag on 12 December 1916, offered a negotiated peace (Verständigungsfrieden) to the Entente. He had the full support of the Emperor, who wrote in approval of Bethmann Hollweg's efforts that the peace proposal was "a moral deed necessary to relieve the world of the pressures weighing on all". The governments of the Entente states, however, viewed the initiative skeptically.

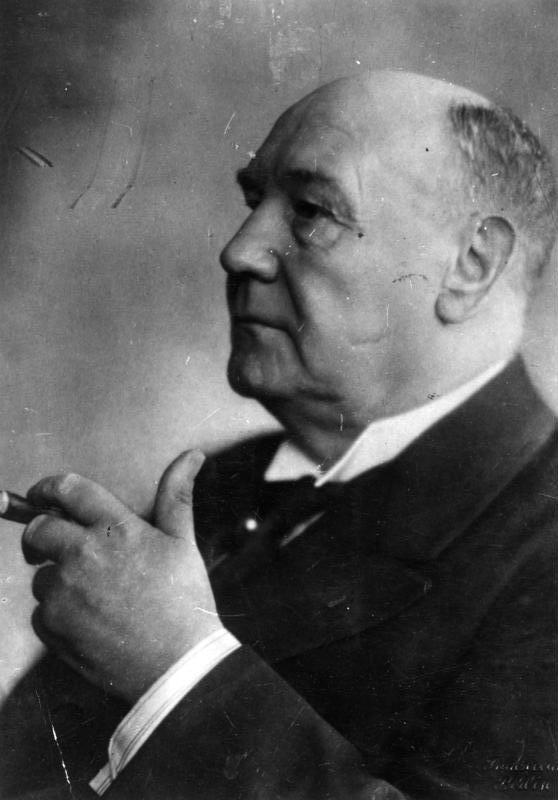
Wilhelm Solf

On 18 December U.S. President Woodrow Wilson revealed his long-awaited peace initiative. He called for the disclosure of clearly formulated war aims – which the Empire was prepared to do – including withdrawal from Belgium. In response to demands by the pan-Germans, Wilhelm Solf made the proposal to create a contiguous German colonial empire in central Africa, annexing the Belgian Congo. By creating a German Central Africa, future peace would not be burdened by annexations in Europe. The implementation of the colonial war goal was never a priority to Bethmann Hollweg. What mattered to him and Solf was the formulation of a German war objective acceptable at home and abroad in the event of a victorious peace, something which neither politician believed in any longer.

When the Entente was unwilling to make such compromises, Bethmann Hollweg on 7 January 1917 called for immediate concessions or Germany would respond with unrestricted submarine warfare. The Chancellor's marginal note to the declaration, sent to Ambassador Bernstorff in Washington, showed his negative view of the situation: "Perhaps you know a way to avoid the break with America."

The following day the Reich Chancellor traveled to Pleß in Silesia where a meeting of the Crown Council was to make the decision on submarine warfare. After the OHL and the Reichstag had expressed their approval, the final decision lay with the Emperor. Bethmann Hollweg later wrote that Wilhelm was already completely in support of Ludendorff, who claimed that America had "no soldiers" and that if it did, submarine warfare would already have defeated France and England by the time U.S. forces arrived. Ludendorff's line of reasoning led the Emperor to ask Bethmann Hollweg why he "still had misgivings".

It is difficult to argue against Bethmann Hollweg's later statement that the U-boat war had ultimately been waged because a majority in the Reichstag, the Supreme Army Command and the German people had wanted it. The outcome led the Chancellor to thoughts of resigning. He later told Walther Rathenau that he had stayed on in order to preserve the chances of a negotiated peace in spite of the submarine warfare. To Riezler he said in 1919 that he had not wanted to give way to the "Pan-Germans' rule by the saber". According to his biographer von Vietsch, he was guided by a deep sense of loyalty to the Emperor, whom he did not want to put in a bad light by resigning. From that point on, Bethmann Hollweg was considered a failed politician in Germany.

After the decision at Pleß, Wilson on 22 January read a message to the U.S. Senate that was a precursor to his 14-point program. In it he argued for peace without victors and the right of peoples to self-determination. In March 1917 the Russian February Revolution shook the European power structure. On 29 March Bethmann Hollweg appeared before the press and, contrary to the wishes of the conservatives, declared that the Reich would not reinstate the government of the Tsar under any circumstances. The internal affairs of Russia, he said, were a matter for the Russian people. The internal political turmoil seemed to him to increase the chance of a special peace with Russia. It was also at this time that Germany expressed its support for Lenin's return from exile.

Prompted by the changed circumstances and the declaration of war by the United States against Germany on 6 April, Wilhelm II initiated the 23 April Kreuznach Conference on War Objectives. Bethmann Hollweg proposed renouncing all annexations, but the idea was rejected in principle by the OHL. Everyone involved saw that Bethmann Hollweg then agreed to the OHL's war aims only because he thought that they would never be carried out. He noted, "I do not allow myself to be bound in any way by the protocol. If opportunities for peace open up anywhere, I pursue them."

==== Prussian electoral law reform ====
At that time the long postponed electoral law reform in Prussia reappeared on the political agenda. On 27 February 1917 Bethmann Hollweg came before the Reichstag and in a speech that he later called his "most significant" said that he saw the typically German expression of a liberal form of government in a monarchy based "on the broad shoulders of the free man". A progressive, social "people's empire" seemed to him acceptable to right and left, and therefore the long term solution to domestic problems.

But this form of government had no appeal to the outside world, especially the USA. Bethmann Hollweg's intellectual limitation to German idealism made him misjudge its international impact. In the last months of his term, the Chancellor pursued the goal of a parliamentary monarchy and reform of Prussia's electoral system. On 9 March the conservatives moved even further away from the center and rejected the "whole liberal and parliamentary idea". To avoid a break with them, the Chancellor – who was also Prussian minister president – again avoided general constitutional theory in his remarks to the Prussian House of Lords. But he clearly rejected an insistence on three-class suffrage and said that his preference was to reform the electoral law as soon as possible. He nevertheless pointed out that rushing the issue could have "fatal" consequences and uttered words that were to echo widely:

Woe to the statesman who does not recognize the signs of the times, woe to the statesman who believes that after a catastrophe such as the world has never before seen, we could simply pick up where we left off.

Although Bethmann Hollweg had wanted to avoid any rupture by using imprecise formulations, the right took the speech as an expression of anti-state sentiment. The reactionary wing of the conservatives insulted him as a "henchman of the Jews and Social Democrats". The progressive Conrad Haußmann (DVP), on the other hand, spoke of a "historic event" because the Chancellor had openly placed himself on the left.

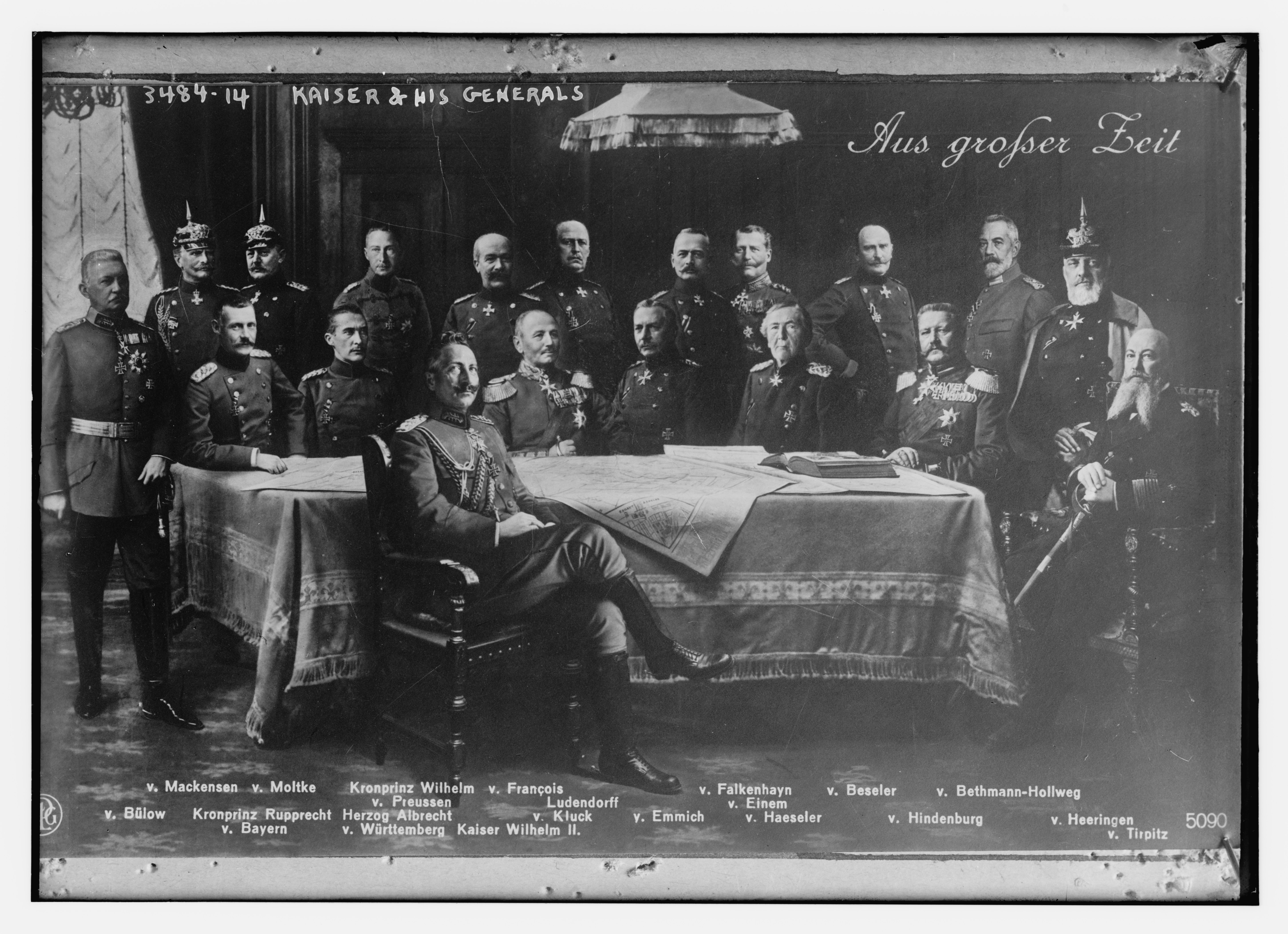
Emperor Wilhelm II in an undated photo. Bethmann Hollweg is second from the right, standing. The German words above him mean "From a Great Time".

On 31 March 1917 Bethmann Hollweg appointed a commission to draft an emperor's message that would explicitly mention equal suffrage. The tired and spent chancellor then mustered all his remaining resolve and traveled to Bad Homburg to see Wilhelm II. In deference to conservative circles, the Emperor refused to make direct reference to equal (manhood) suffrage. Bethmann Hollweg agitatedly explained to him that it was impossible for him to advocate a bill under which a "worker adorned with the Iron Cross First Class would have to go to the polls next to a well-off draft dodger from the same village" with unequal voting rights. In the end Wilhelm II agreed to the wording of the Easter message and thus to the democratization of Prussia. Ludendorff described the Easter Message of 7 April, which promised the abolition of three-class suffrage, as "kowtowing to revolution".

The SPD called for a clear commitment from the German government to peace without annexations. There was hope for the peace initiative of Pope Benedict XV, who had offered to mediate between the warring parties. The Chancellor and Wilhelm II agreed with the Pope's efforts and were prepared to release Belgium and cede Alsace–Lorraine. The nuncio in Munich, Eugenio Pacelli, later said confidentially that the prospects for peace would have been good if Bethmann Hollweg had remained chancellor.

It was at that time that Matthias Erzberger of the Centre Party put his Reichstag Peace Resolution before the main parliamentary committee. The efforts, which in their radicalism were also directed against the Chancellor, astonished Bethmann Hollweg, since the position of the broad Reichstag majority had always been with him.

==== Resignation and retirement ====
Ludendorff then saw an opportunity to have the Reichstag accomplish his goal of deposing Bethmann Hollweg. At the forefront of his thinking was the National Liberal Gustav Stresemann, who held annexationist positions and declared the Chancellor unsuitable for a negotiated peace. "A Reich chancellor must be able to assert himself; if he cannot, he must draw the consequences." In his reply, Bethmann Hollweg spoke of the "overwhelming achievements of the people in the war". He was convinced that equal manhood suffrage would bring "no impairment, but an extraordinary strengthening and consolidation of the monarchical idea." The words led Emperor Wilhelm II to say to his chief of cabinet von Valentini, "And I am to dismiss the man who towers above all others by a head!"

Two days after the Chancellor's speech, the Emperor published his "July Message" in which he pledged that "the next elections can be held under the new, equal [manhood] suffrage law". Wilhelm Solf later called this a "complete victory for the idea of a social emperor". In response, Colonel Max Bauer, OHL commissioner, spread the word that Ludendorff thought the war was lost if the Chancellor stayed. Crown Prince Wilhelm suggested to his father that representatives of the Reichstag parties be consulted about the Chancellor's staying. The deputies Kuno von Westarp (German Conservative party), Gustav Stresemann (National liberal party), and Erich Mertin (Free Conservative Party) spoke in favor of the Chancellor's dismissal, and only Friedrich von Payer (Progressive People's Party) and Eduard David (SPD) spoke in favor of his remaining in office.

In their efforts to achieve a negotiated peace, the majority parties in the Reichstag saw Bethmann Hollweg as an unacceptable negotiator because he had been in the position too long and, in their view, was too weak in his dealings with the Supreme Army Command. He was too willing to compromise with them even though he had held out the prospect of internal reforms.

In a letter to the Emperor dated 12 July 1917, Ludendorff threatened to resign, and Hindenburg joined in the ultimatum. To spare the Emperor and himself the embarrassment of a dismissal, Bethmann Hollweg submitted his resignation. The Emperor yielded to pressure from the military leadership and agreed to the request. On 13 July 1917 Bethmann Hollweg resigned.

The reactions to Bethmann Hollweg's resignation were as varied as the assessments of his activities during his term in office. He himself wrote that he could resign without bitterness but with pain at the spectacle Germany was offering the "listening enemy". His successor, Georg Michaelis, whose name was put forward by the OHL, prevented the papal peace initiative from advancing when he withdrew concessions, including withdrawal from Belgium. Michaelis was succeeded on 1 November 1917 by Georg von Hertling, a conservative southern German whom Bethmann Hollweg from the beginning had wanted as his successor. Hertling nevertheless admitted that he disliked Bethmann's views, "which leaned very far to the left".

The former chancellor retired to his Hohenfinow estate and devoted himself to agriculture. He called the revolution that broke out in Germany in November 1918 a "désastre". He thought that the result of the world war should have been a genuine league of nations, but now only a "sham league built on imperialist orgies" would be the result. Whether they liked it or not, they were standing "on the threshold of a new era, and a democratic one at that".

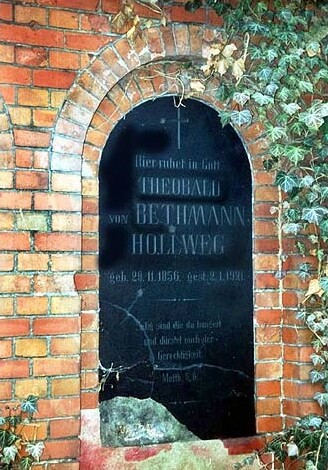
Theobald von Bethmann Hollweg's grave

In May 1919 the first part of Bethmann Hollweg's Reflections on the World War was published. In retrospect he viewed Germany's part in the start of the war as follows:

We were burdened in the heaviest way by 1870/1871 [the Franco-Prussian War] and by our central geographical position. After the Emperor came to power, we often did the opposite of what we could have done to make the burden bearable. Admittedly, world imperialism would have prevailed even without our intervention, and it remains very doubtful whether we could have prevented the natural French, Russian, and British antagonisms from uniting against us, even if we had acted reasonably. Guilt we have brought upon ourselves, but only all-round and common guilt could have given rise to the world catastrophe.

Bethmann Hollweg received prominent attention throughout the world in June 1919 when he formally asked the Allied and Associated Powers to place him on trial instead of the Emperor. The Supreme War Council decided to ignore his request. He was often mentioned as among those who might be tried by Allies for political offences in connection with the origin of the war.

Theobald von Bethmann Hollweg died of acute pneumonia on 1 January 1921 without having been able to complete the second part of his reflections. On the gravestone of the former Reich chancellor is a Bible verse of his own choosing: "Blessed are those who hunger and thirst for righteousness" (Matthew 5:6).

=== Cabinet ===
Cabinet (1909–1917)
| Office | Incumbent | In office | Party |
|---|---|---|---|
| Imperial Chancellor | Theobald von Bethmann Hollweg | 14 July 1909 – 13 July 1917 | None |
| Vice-Chancellor of Germany; Secretary of the Interior | Clemens von Delbrück | 14 July 1909 – 22 May 1916 | None |
| Vice-Chancellor of Germany; Secretary of the Interior | Karl Helfferich | 22 May 1916 – 23 October 1917 | None |
| Secretary for Foreign Affairs | Wilhelm von Schoen | 7 October 1907 – 28 June 1910 | None |
| Secretary for Foreign Affairs | Alfred von Kiderlen-Waechter | 28 June 1910 – 30 December 1912 | None |
| Secretary for Foreign Affairs | Gottlieb von Jagow | 30 December 1912 – 22. November 1916 | None |
| Secretary for Foreign Affairs | Arthur Zimmermann | 22 November 1916 – 6 August 1917 | None |
| Secretary of Justice | Rudolf Arnold Nieberding | 10 July 1893 – 25 October 1909 | None |
| Secretary of Justice | Hermann Lisco | 25 October 1909 – 5 August 1917 | None |
| Secretary of the Treasury | Adolf Wermuth | 14 July 1909 – 16 March 1912 | None |
| Secretary of the Treasury | Hermann Kühn | 16 March 1912 – 31 January 1915 | None |
| Secretary of the Treasury | Karl Helfferich | 31 January 1915 – 22 May 1916 | None |
| Secretary of the Treasury | Siegfried von Roedern | 22 May 1916 – 13 November 1918 | None |
| Secretary of the Post Office | Reinhold Kraetke | 6 May 1901 – 5 August 1917 | None |
| Secretary of the Navy | Alfred von Tirpitz | 18 June 1897 – 15 March 1916 | None |
| Secretary of the Navy | Eduard von Capelle | 15 March 1916 – 5 October 1918 | None |
| Secretary for the Colonies | Bernhard Dernburg | 17 May 1907 – 9 June 1910 | None |
| Secretary for the Colonies | Friedrich von Lindequist | 10 June 1910 – 3 November 1911 | None |
| Secretary for the Colonies | Wilhelm Solf | 20 November 1911 – 13 December 1918 | None |
| Secretary for Food | Adolf Tortilowicz von Batocki-Friebe | 26 May 1916 – 6 August 1917 | None |

== Political legacy and historical assessment ==
None of Bethmann Hollweg's circle of friends achieved significant influence during the Weimar Republic. The only politician whose worldview was related to Bethmann Hollweg's was Gustav Stresemann. But it was he who, as a National Liberal member of the Reichstag, had railed against Bethmann Hollweg.

Adolf Hitler was hostile towards the Reich chancellor's personality in his book Mein Kampf. He lamented the "miserable attitude and weakness of this philosophizing weakling". He called his Reichstag speeches a "helpless stammering". Grand Admiral Alfred von Tirpitz condemned the "leaning of our intellectuals toward Western culture".

Bethmann Hollweg's dealings with the Social Democrats influenced the course of the party's history. As a result of Burgfriedenspolitik, the SPD became "electable" for large sections of the middle classes and, as a people's party, was able to exert great influence on the constitution of the Weimar Republic as well as on that of the Federal Republic of Germany. According to historian Eberhard von Vietsch, the SPD's development into a bourgeois people's party to the left of center would have been more difficult without Bethmann Hollweg's initiative to integrate the SPD into the political system.

Bethmann Hollweg's domestic opponents accused him of being a "defeatist" who wanted to cheat the "people of the fruits of victory" with a "rotten peace". The assessment was preserved by national parties in the Weimar Republic until it finally became official with the victory of the Nazi Party. After 1945 Bethmann Hollweg was considered a "chancellor without qualities", an "indecisive Hamlet who doubted himself".

In Hohenfinow today, only the weathered and partially destroyed grave of the former Reich chancellor remains.

== Honors and awards ==
=== Orders and decorations ===
- Prussia:
  - Knight of the Black Eagle, with Collar and in Brilliants
  - Knight of the Red Eagle, 3rd Class with Bow and Crown
  - Knight of the Crown Order, 2nd Class
  - Grand Commander's Cross of the Royal House Order of Hohenzollern
  - Red Cross Medal, 3rd Class
  - Landwehr Service Medal, 2nd Class
- Hohenzollern: Cross of Honour of the Princely House Order of Hohenzollern, 1st Class
- Anhalt: Grand Cross of the Order of Albert the Bear
- Baden:
  - Grand Cross of the Zähringer Lion, with Oak Leaves, 1908
  - Knight of the House Order of Fidelity
- Bavaria:
  - Knight of St. Hubert, 1909
  - Grand Cross of Merit of the Bavarian Crown
- Brunswick: Grand Cross of the Order of Henry the Lion
- (Saxe-Coburg and Gotha) (Duchy of Saxe-Altenburg) (Saxe-Meiningen) Ernestine duchies: Grand Cross of the Saxe-Ernestine House Order
- Grand Duchy of Hesse:
  - Grand Cross of the Merit Order of Philip the Magnanimous, 21 November 1908
  - Grand Cross of the Ludwig Order, 25 November 1910
- Mecklenburg:
  - Grand Cross of the Wendish Crown, with Golden Crown
  - Grand Cross of the Griffon
- Saxony:
  - Knight of the Rue Crown
  - Grand Cross of the Albert Order, with Golden Star
- Schaumburg-Lippe: Cross of Honour of the House Order of Schaumburg-Lippe, 1st Class
- Württemberg: Grand Cross of the Württemberg Crown
- (Austrian Empire) (Kingdom of Hungary) Austria-Hungary: Grand Cross of the Royal Hungarian Order of St. Stephen, 1909; in Brilliants, 1917
- Belgium: Grand Cordon of the Order of Leopold
- Bulgaria: Grand Cross of St. Alexander, with Collar
- Denmark:
  - Grand Cross of the Dannebrog, 19 November 1906
  - Knight of the Elephant, 25 February 1913
- Italy:
  - Knight of the Annunciation, 22 March 1910
  - Grand Cross of the Crown of Italy
- Ottoman Empire: Order of Osmanieh, 1st Class in Brilliants
- Persia: Order of the Lion and the Sun, 1st Class in Brilliants
- Romania: Grand Cross of the Crown of Romania
- Russia: Knight of St. Andrew, 1910
- Spain: Grand Cross of the Order of Charles III, 2 November 1905
- Sweden: Commander Grand Cross of the North Star, 1908
- United Kingdom: Honorary Knight Grand Cross of the Royal Victorian Order

=== Military appointments ===
- Major general à la suite of the Prussian Army

== See also ==
- Causes of World War I
- German entry into World War I
- History of Germany during World War I
- Bellevue Conference (September 11, 1917)
- Berlin Conference (March 26-27, 1917)

Political offices
| Preceded by Prince Bülow | Chancellor of Germany; 1909–1917 | Succeeded by Georg Michaelis |
| Preceded by Prince Bülow | Prime Minister of Prussia; 1909–1917 | Succeeded by Georg Michaelis |
| Preceded by Arthur von Posadowsky-Wehner | Vice Chancellor of Germany; 1907–1909 | Succeeded by Clemens von Delbrück |
