= 9 January 1917 German Crown Council meeting =

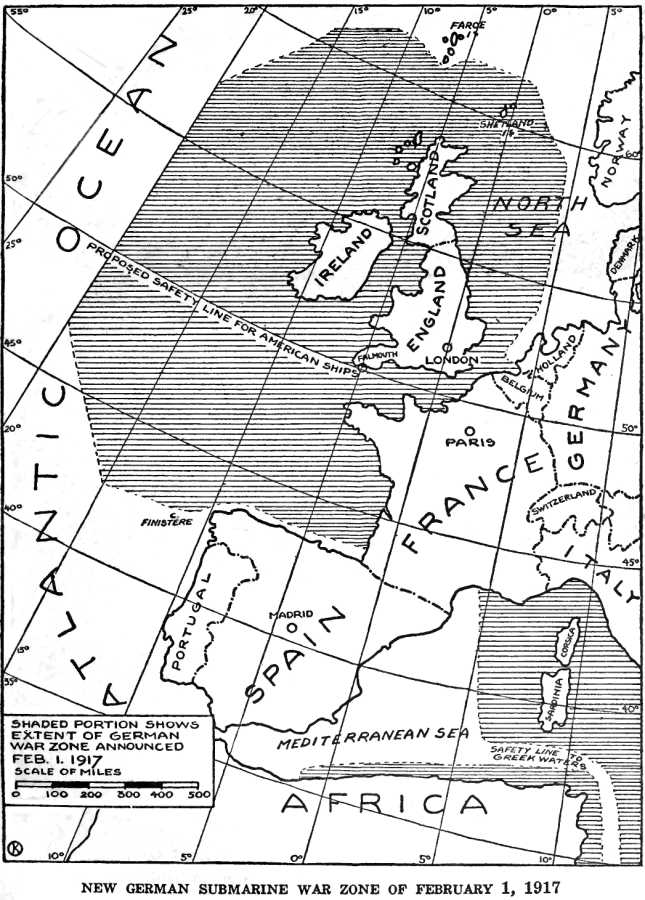
The areas of unrestricted submarine warfare in effect from 1 February 1917

The 9 January 1917 Crown Council meeting, presided over by Kaiser (German Emperor) Wilhelm II, decided on the resumption of unrestricted submarine warfare by the Imperial German Navy during the First World War. The policy had been proposed by the German military in 1916, but was opposed by the civilian government under Chancellor Theobald von Bethmann Hollweg; he feared it would alienate neutral powers, including the United States.

Bethmann Hollweg insisted that the final decision lay with Wilhelm, and a Crown Council meeting was held to discuss the matter. The military, led by head of the German Imperial Admiralty Staff Henning von Holtzendorff and chief of the German General Staff Paul von Hindenburg, advocated in favour of the policy. They argued that the increased volume of shipping that could be sunk under the policy would knock Britain out of the war and that any adverse reaction from the US would be moot.

The policy was announced to the United States on 31 January 1917 and commenced the following day. Although sinkings initially increased, Britain's switch to a convoy system reduced the effectiveness of the policy. The readoption of unrestricted submarine warfare was one of the reasons for the American declaration of war on Germany on 6 April 1917.

== Background ==
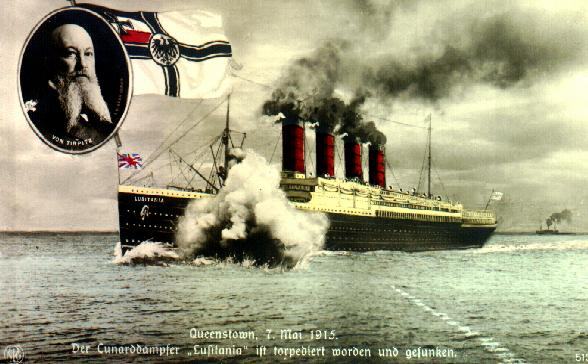
A contemporary German depiction of the sinking of the RMS Lusitania during the first unrestricted submarine warfare campaign

Germany, as part of the Central Powers, had been at war with Britain and the other Allies since 1914. Merchant shipping was vital to the Allied war effort, carrying material from the neutral United States across the Atlantic Ocean to Britain and France. From 4 February 1915 to 1 September 1915 Germany implemented unrestricted submarine warfare, in which merchant vessels were liable to sinking by U-boats without warning. The campaign was abandoned following American protests after the sinking of the liners Lusitania and Arabic, in which a number of US citizens were killed.

By 1916 there had been no major breakthrough in the war on land or sea and arguments were made by the military to resume unrestricted submarine warfare. This was opposed by the civilian government of Chancellor Theobald von Bethmann Hollweg, who had the support of Vice-chancellor Karl Helfferich and Foreign Secretary Gottlieb von Jagow, on the basis that it would turn the remaining neutral powers against Germany. Bethmann Hollweg and Helfferich again voiced the government's concerns over the policy in a meeting with military figures at Schloss Pleß, a palace in Silesia used by Kaiser (German Emperor) Wilhelm II, on 29 December, but stated that the final decision must lie with Wilhelm. A meeting of the German Crown Council to discuss the matter was planned for 9 January 1917.

The crown council (German: Kronrat) was a form of privy council advising the kaiser on matters of state. They were relatively rare in the pre-war era and sometimes were not held for years at a time. They were attended by the kaiser, royal princes, government ministers, senior generals and the heads of the kaiser's military and naval households. The Crown Council had met on 29 July 1914 to decide to escalate the July Crisis into war. It had been a Crown Council of 31 May 1915 that had ended the first phase of unrestricted submarine warfare, one at Potsdam on 21 December had decided on the Verdun Offensive and one in March 1916 had permitted U-boat commanders to attack Allied merchant vessels without warning, whilst sparing passenger liners and neutral vessels.

== Meeting ==
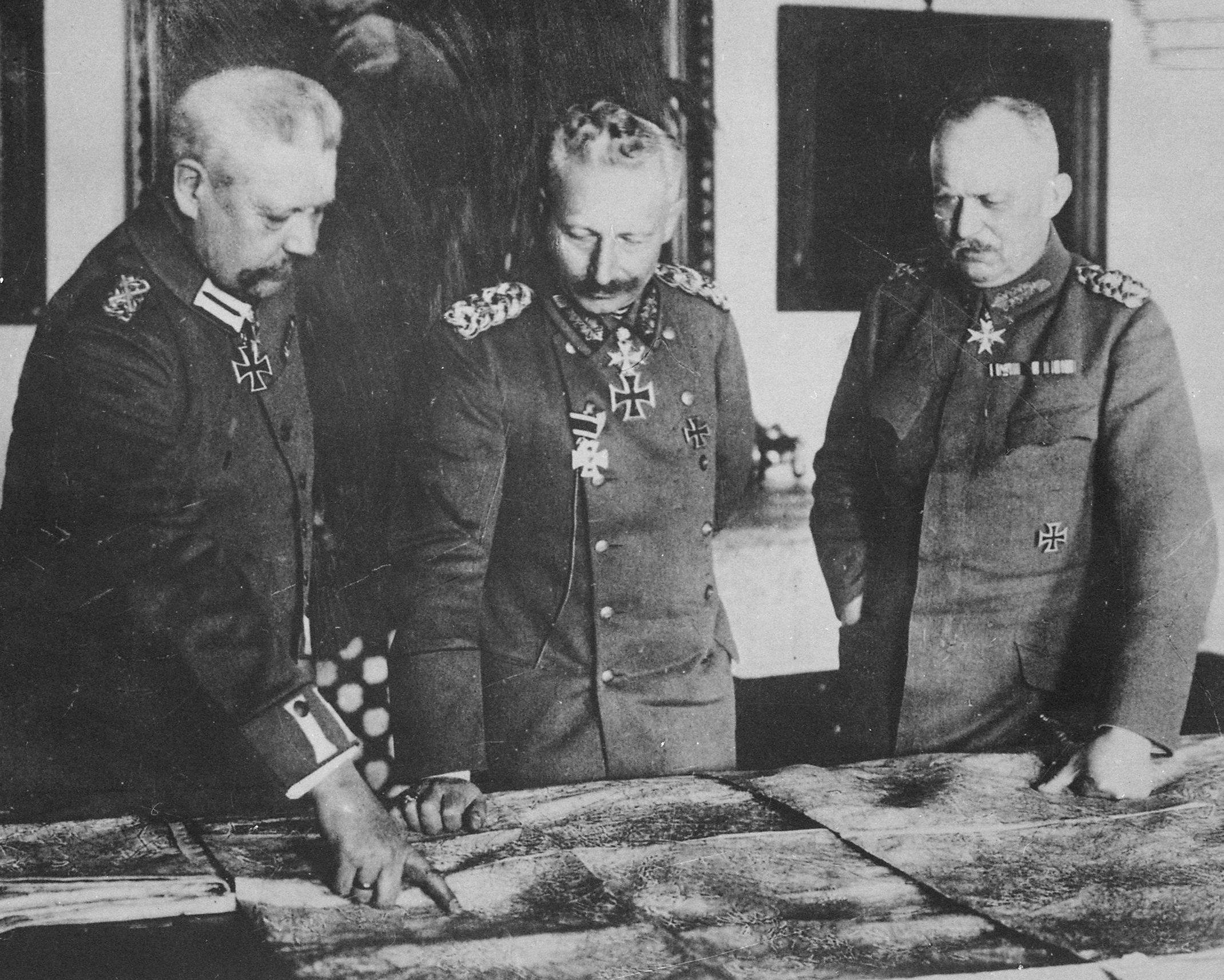
Wilhelm II, Paul von Hindenburg and Erich Ludendorff meeting on 8 January 1917

Senior figures in the German army and navy met on 8 January to agree that they would seek to persuade Wilhelm to implement unrestricted submarine warfare the following day. On 9 January, before the Crown Council session, Bethmann Hollweg met with Paul von Hindenburg, chief of the German General Staff, and Erich Ludendorff, the first quartermaster general, the effective heads of the German military, to discuss the policy. Bethmann Hollweg spoke with them for about an hour to make his argument that the policy should not be implemented but was unsuccessful in changing their minds.

The Crown Council began at 18.00 and was presided over by Wilhelm. It was attended by Bethmann Hollweg; Hindenburg; Ludendorff; the chief of the German Imperial Naval Cabinet, Georg Alexander von Müller; the head of the German Imperial Admiralty Staff, Henning von Holtzendorff; the Chief of the civil cabinet, Rudolf von Valentini; and the chief of the military cabinet, Moriz von Lyncker. The group stood around a large table, upon which Wilhelm leaned.

Hindenburg and Holtzendorff spoke in favour of the policy. Bethmann Hollweg spoke against it stating that "we must reckon, however, on the entry of America into the war, her help will consist of the delivery of food to England, financial assistance, the supply of aeroplanes and a force of volunteers". To this Hindenburg retorted that "we are already prepared to deal with that. The chances of the submarine operations are more favourable than they are likely to be again. We can and must begin them". He also considered his army could deal with any declaration of war by neutral Denmark or the Netherlands as a result of the policy and dismissed Bethmann Hollweg's suggestion that long-neutral Switzerland might join the war.

Von Holtzendorff stated that his staff considered that the U-boats could sink up around 600,000 tons of Allied shipping a month if the policy was in place and thought that this would "bring Britain to her knees". The army and navy advice was that unrestricted submarine warfare would eliminate Britain from the war within 4-6 months, rendering any impact from the United States joining the war moot. Wilhelm quoted from a newspaper article by a German industrialist that supported unrestricted submarine warfare.

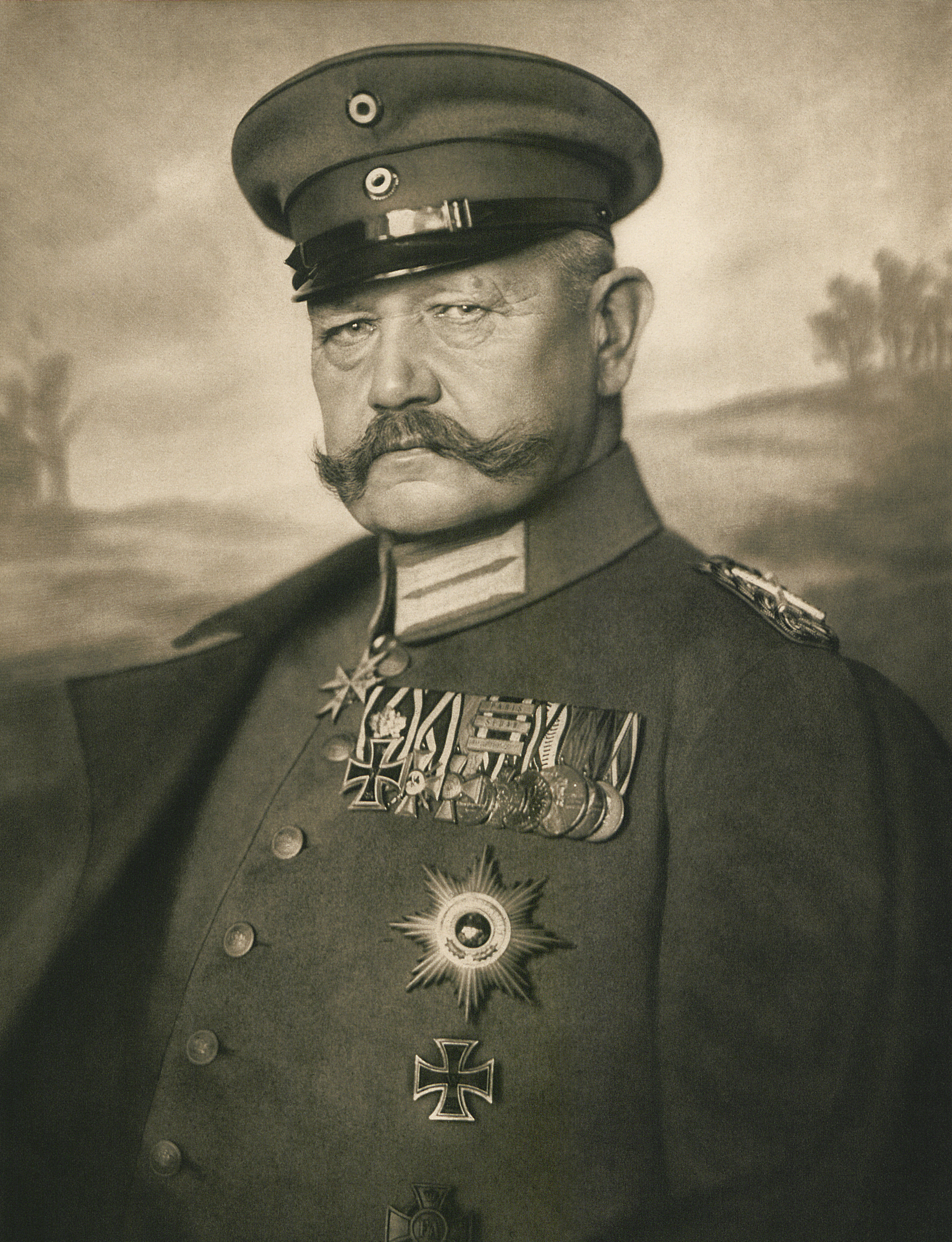
Paul von Hindenburg

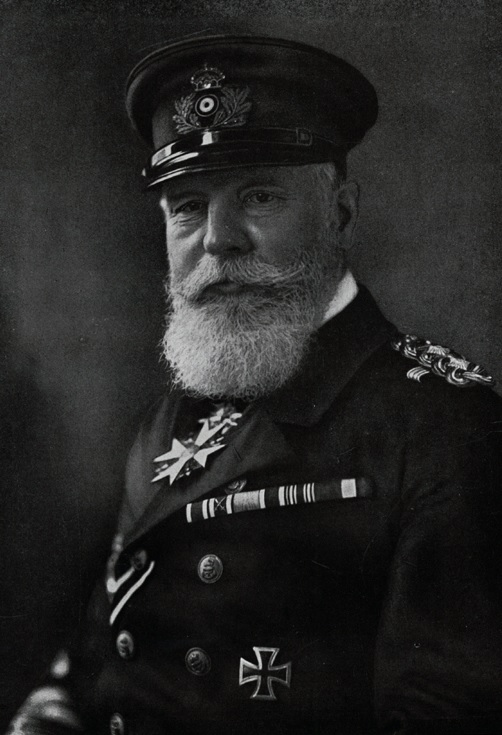
Henning von Holtzendorff

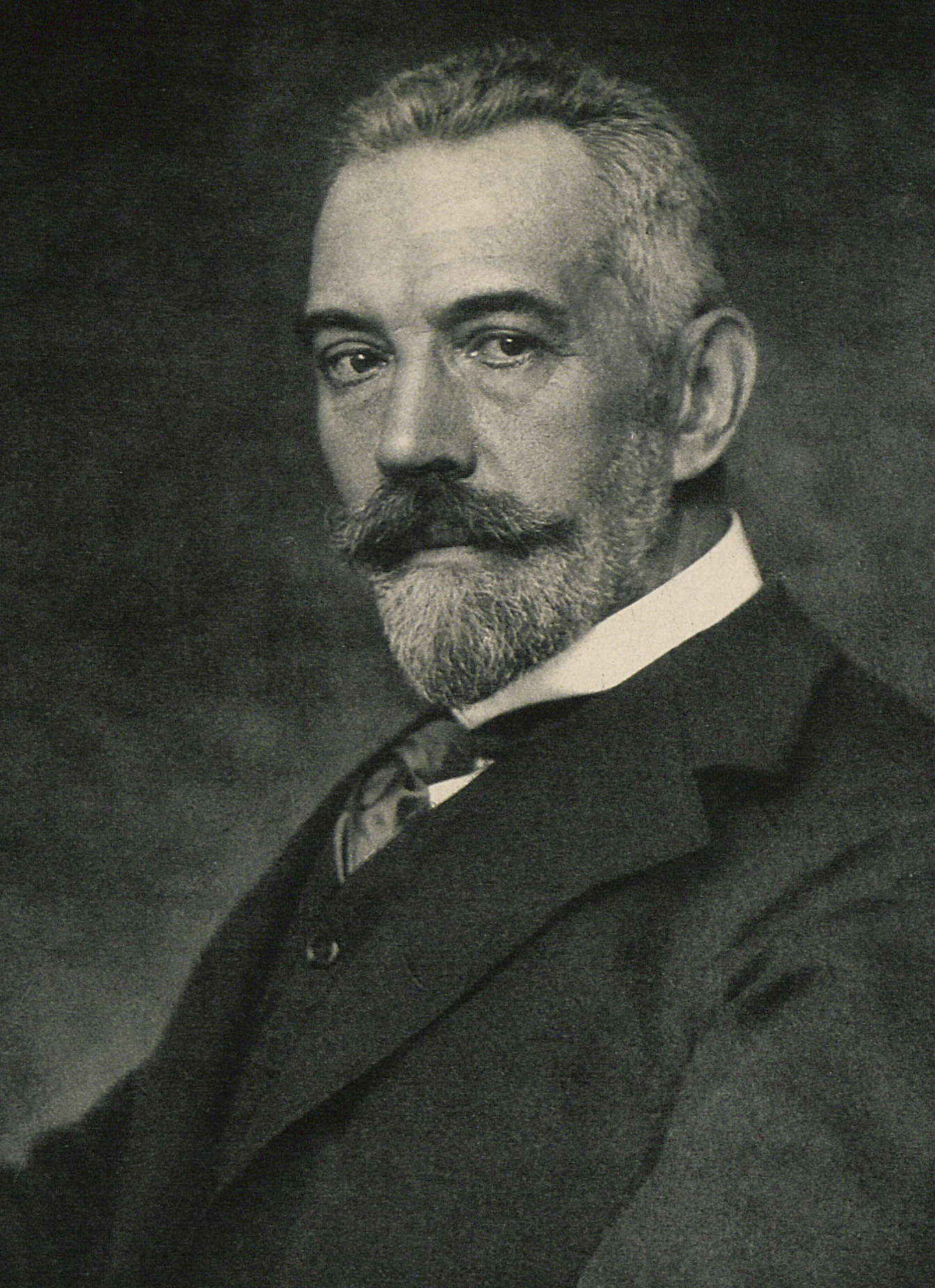
Theobald von Bethmann Hollweg

Paul von Hindenburg and Henning von Holtzendorff advocated for resuming unrestricted submarine warfare while Theobald von Bethmann Hollweg argued against it.

Wilhelm was generally sympathetic to Bethmann Hollweg, who was suffering from a cold, but at one point grew impatient, stating "by God, this man still has scruples". Wilhelm declared that he was persuaded by the arguments in favour of unrestricted submarine warfare and that the policy would be adopted. He stated at the council that if the US declared war because of the policy then it would be "so much the better", though he noted that measures might be taken to avoid the sinking of American passenger liners under the policy. No such measures were implemented. Once Wilhelm had decided, Bethmann Hollweg stated that he was not in agreement but would no longer oppose the measures. Müller noted that Bethmann Hollweg's position was "not so much approval as an acceptance of the facts". When he retired to bed Bethmann Hollweg cautioned Müller that the decision might lead to Germany having to come to peace terms of an "exceedingly modest" level.

Müller, a close confidante of Wilhelm, later said that he thought the Kaiser had settled on adopting unrestricted submarine warfare the night before the council which he had spent reading a memorandum prepared by Holtzendorff. A factor in the decision is thought to have been the threatened resignation of Hindenburg and Ludendorff if the policy was not adopted. Bethmann Hollweg considered resigning over the Crown Council decision but determined to remain as a bastion against further demands from the military and in the hope of working to keep the US neutral.

Germany's ally, Austria-Hungary, was not informed of the decision to reintroduce unrestricted submarine warfare until 20 January when Holtzendorff and German foreign secretary Arthur Zimmermann met with Emperor Charles I and senior Austrian politicians in Vienna. In their own Crown Council meeting of 22 January the Austrians agreed to join the unrestricted warfare campaign; their support with submarines and naval bases was vital to the campaign in the Mediterranean. Many Austrian politicians considered that although framed as a request, the Germans left them with no real choice but to support the measure. The formal agreement was made between Wilhelm and Charles in Berlin on 26 January.

== Later events ==
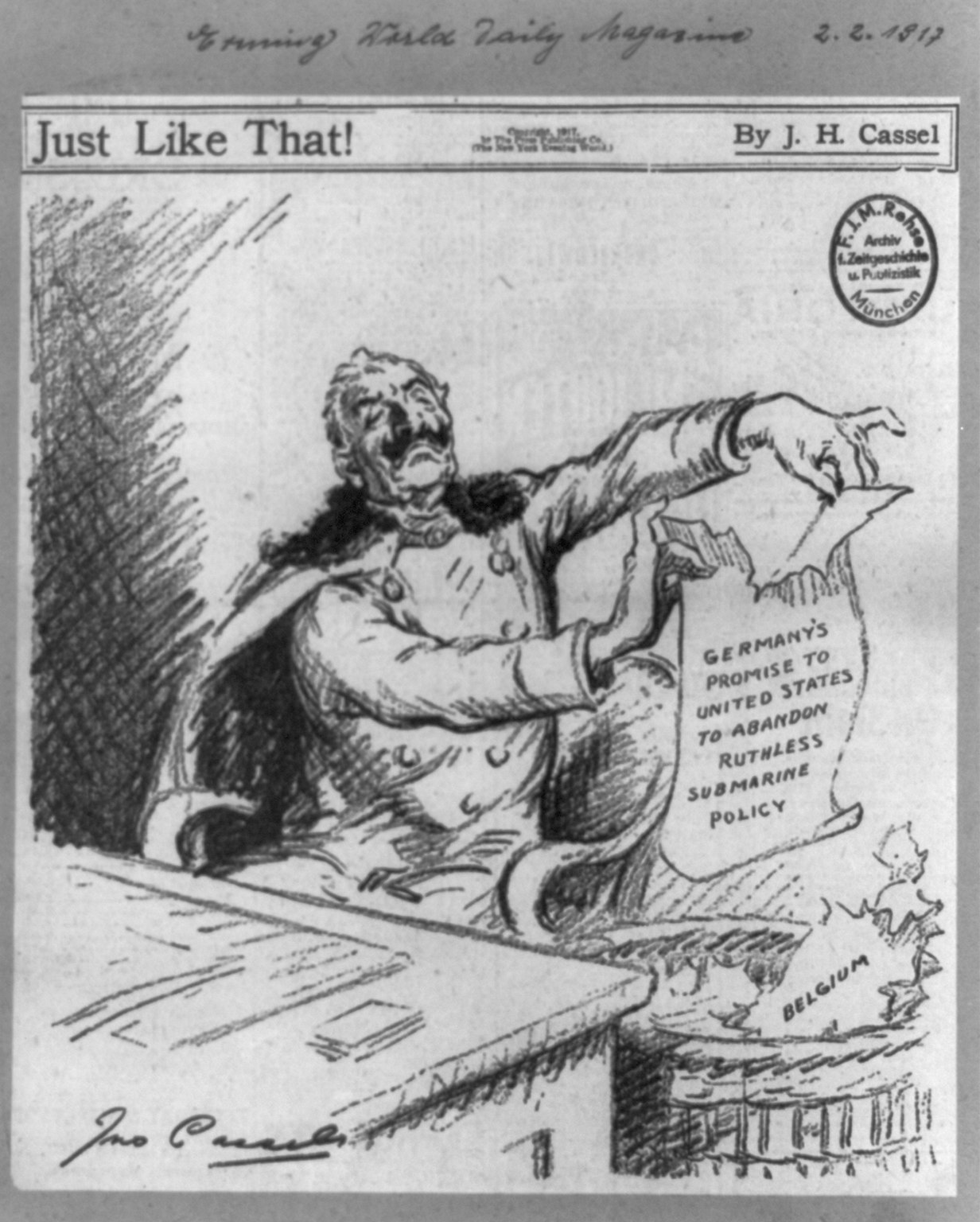
An American cartoon of 2 February, depicting Wilhelm ripping up his promise to the US to abandon unrestricted submarine warfare

On 31 January the US government was notified that Germany would implement unrestricted submarine warfare in the waters adjacent to the British Isles, the sea within 400 nautical miles (740 km; 460 mi) of the western French coast and all of the Mediterranean Sea bar Spanish coastal waters and a 20 nautical miles (37 km; 23 mi) lane provided for Greek shipping. All Allied or neutral vessels in these zones would be liable to be sunk by U-boats without warning. One concession was made, that a single American ship per week would be permitted to sail along a "safety lane" to Falmouth provided the vessel was marked and the US government guaranteed that it did not carry contraband. The reason given for the adoption of the policy was the rejection by the Allies of a peace proposal announced by Germany in December 1916, although it is doubtful that the German government seriously considered the Allies would take up the offer in the first place.

In response to the adoption of unrestricted submarine warfare the US broke off all diplomatic relations with Germany on 3 February. The zones were expanded over the following months eventually including the Barents Sea and most of the North Atlantic. The policy was one of the factors that influenced the US government to declare war on Germany on 6 April.

The policy increased the quantity of shipping sunk by U-boats, which had been running at just above 300,000 tons per month since October 1916. Sinkings rose to 520,000 tons in February, 560,000 tons in March and 860,000 tons in April (a record monthly figure that was not surpassed even during the Battle of the Atlantic in the Second World War). Sinkings settled down following the US declaration of war and the commitment of its navy, the third-largest in the world; sinkings ran at 620,000 tons in May and 700,000 tons in June. The June 1917 adoption of the convoy system June reduced sinkings to a level that proved manageable for the British war effort. Shipping lost to U-boats dropped to 560,000 tons in July, 470,000 tons in August and to 350,000 tons in September, though it still outpaced the rate at which it could be replaced. Although food shortages were never as serious as those experienced in Germany under the Allied blockade, a measure of rationing was introduced by the British government in January 1918. Shipping losses ran at around 300,000 tons a month until September 1918, which saw a rapid and broad collapse in German military capabilities.

Bethmann Hollweg's opposition to unrestricted submarine warfare was one of the reasons for his resignation as chancellor in July 1917, brought about by pressure on Wilhelm from the military leadership. This led Germany to move towards a more militaristic government. Ludendorff acted almost as a military dictator until reverses on the Western Front led to his own resignation in September 1918. The war ended with the defeat of Germany and the signing of the Armistice of 11 November 1918.
