= Georg von Hertling =

Chancellor of the German Empire from 1917 to 1918

Count Georg von Hertling
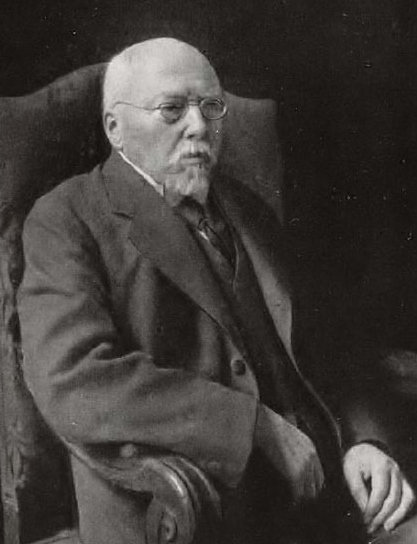
- Hertling in 1919

Chancellor of the German Empire
- In office 1 November 1917 – 30 September 1918
- Monarch: Wilhelm II
- Deputy: Karl Helfferich; Friedrich von Payer
- Leader: Paul von Hindenburg and Erich Ludendorff
- Preceded by: Georg Michaelis
- Succeeded by: Max von Baden

Minister President of Prussia
- In office 1 November 1917 – 30 September 1918
- Monarch: Wilhelm II
- Preceded by: Georg Michaelis
- Succeeded by: Max von Baden

Minister President of Bavaria
- In office 9 February 1912 – 10 November 1917
- Monarchs: Otto; Ludwig III
- Preceded by: Clemens von Podewils-Dürniz
- Succeeded by: Otto von Dandl

Member of the Reichstag
- In office 1896–1912
- Constituency: Münster 2 (1903-1912); Schwaben 4 (1898-1903); Köln 4 (1896-1898)
- In office 1875–1890
- Constituency: Koblenz 3

Personal details
- Born: Georg Friedrich Freiherr von Hertling; 31 August 1843 Darmstadt, Grand Duchy of Hesse, German Confederation
- Died: 4 January 1919 (aged 75) Ruhpolding, People's State of Bavaria, Weimar Republic
- Party: Centre
- Spouse: Anna Freiin von Biegeleben (m. 1845)
- Children: 3

Georg Friedrich Karl Freiherr von Hertling, from 1914 Count von Hertling, (31 August 1843 – 4 January 1919) was a German politician of the Catholic Centre Party. He was foreign minister and minister president of Bavaria, then imperial chancellor of the German Reich and minister president of Prussia from 1 November 1917 to 30 September 1918. He was the first party politician to hold the two offices; all of his predecessors were career civil servants or military men.

Hertling's Catholicism played an important role in both his academic and political life. He belonged to the conservative wing of the Centre Party and resisted moves towards making the government dependent on the will of parliament rather than on the emperor, a stance that helped bring down his government in the final months of World War I.

== Education and non-political activities ==
Hertling came from a Catholic family of civil servants from the Grand Duchy of Hesse. He was born in Darmstadt, the son of the Hessian court councilor Jakob Freiherr von Hertling and his wife Antonie (née von Guaita).

The religious education he received through his mother made him consider becoming a priest. He attended the Ludwig-Georgs-Gymnasium where he was a student under a principal who preserved the institute's humanistic character against the emerging natural sciences. He then studied philosophy at the Ludwig-Maximilians-Universität München, the University of Münster, and the Friedrich Wilhelm University of Berlin, where he received his doctorate in 1864.

He qualified at the University of Bonn in 1867 to teach at the university level, but because he was a professing Catholic it was not until 1880 that he was appointed to an associate professorship. The delay was due to the Kulturkampf (culture struggle) taking place in Prussia between the government under Otto von Bismarck and the Catholic Church, primarily over issues of clerical control of education and ecclesiastical appointments. The experience contributed to Hertling taking a leading role in the 1876 founding of the Görres Society, a learned association for the cultivation of science in Catholic Germany. He remained its president until his death in 1919. Hertling received a full professorship at the Ludwig-Maximilians-Universität München in 1882. Before that he published books on Aristotle in 1871 and Albertus Magnus in 1880.

Hertling was one of the pioneers of the movement for Catholic student fraternities. He joined the Catholic German Student Fraternity Aenania in Munich in 1862 and later the Catholic Student Association Arminia in Bonn. His speech at the 1863 Catholic Congress in Frankfurt, in which he presented religion, science, and friendship as the guiding principles of the Catholic fraternity student, is considered the catalyst for the founding of the Würzburg Federation, an association of Catholic student groups that still exists today as the Kartellverband.

Hertling was president of the German Society for Christian Art from its founding in 1893 until 1911.

He was married to Anna Freiin von Biegeleben (1845–1919), from an influential family of civil servants. The Hertlings had one son and five daughters, one of whom died young. Hertling was a great-nephew of the Romantic writer Bettina von Arnim and the poet Clemens Brentano. The actress Gila von Weitershausen (born 1944) is a great-granddaughter.

== Member of parliament and Bavarian minister president ==
From 1875 to 1890 and 1896 to 1912, Hertling was a member of the German Reichstag as a representative of the Catholic Centre Party. He devoted himself first to sociopolitical issues and later primarily to foreign and financial policy. From 1909 to 1912 he was chairman of the centre's parliamentary group, advocating the reconciliation of German Catholicism with the predominantly Protestant and Prussian-influenced national state. In 1891 Prince Regent Luitpold of Bavaria made him a Reichsrat, a life member of the House of Councillors (Kammer der Reichsräte), the upper house of the Bavarian Landtag, or state parliament.

On 9 February 1912 the prince regent appointed Hertling chairman of the Bavarian Ministry of State and Bavarian foreign minister, i.e., as minister president, at which time the former regent, then King Ludwig III, also made him a count. The appointment of a representative of the majority party in the state parliament to the office of head of government was a first and indicated the beginning of Bavaria's parliamentarization. Unlike his more liberal predecessor Clemens von Podewils-Dürniz, he had a secure parliamentary base and formed his own cabinet.

Social issues were among the most pressing problems in politics, and in 1913 the Bavarian government drew up plans to provide state support for the unemployed, but these failed in the upper chamber. As a result, demonstrations took place across Bavaria in early 1914.

After the heir to the Austro-Hungarian throne, Archduke Franz Ferdinand, was assassinated in Sarajevo in June 1914, the situation in the Balkans did not come up as an issue at the meeting of the Bavarian Council of Ministers on 15 July. When the minister president of Württemberg, Karl von Weizsäcker, suggested that a Bundesrat committee be convened to find a common position for the smaller federal states, Munich waved it off.

During World War I, Hertling supported the policies of the independent Reich Chancellor Theobald von Bethmann Hollweg. Frederick Augustus II, Grand Duke of Oldenburg, as a spokesman for those who wanted Germany to annex foreign territory following a presumed victory in the war, suggested to the Bavarian King Ludwig III in March 1915 that he demand from Emperor Wilhelm II, on behalf of the German princes, the dismissal of Bethmann Hollweg, who in his opinion was too weak and stood in the way of a "German peace" – i.e., one with annexations. The King, who wanted to enlarge Bavaria after a victory, did not take the step because Hertling was able to prevent the initiative.

The simmering conflict between farmers and city dwellers caused by food shortages during the war was also played out between the parties in the Bavarian parliament and led to ministerial resignations in December 1916, although Hertling remained minister president. Bavaria's social situation grew increasingly worse.

On 31 August 1916 the Supreme Army Command announced the Hindenburg Program developed by Erich Ludendorff and Paul von Hindenburg. It called for drastic measures to increase economic output. Its massive strengthening of imperial power was accompanied by a corresponding weakening of the federal states' ability to act politically.

After the fall of Bethmann Hollweg in July 1917, Hertling declined to assume the Reich chancellorship. Only after the failure of Bethmann's successor Georg Michaelis did Hertling, who was 74 and physically frail, take over the offices of Reich chancellor and minister president of Prussia on 1 November 1917. He was the first party politician to hold the combined posts; all of his predecessors had been career civil servants or military men. It was initially planned to have Michaelis continue in office as Prussian minister president, but he did not have the necessary votes in parliament. In Bavaria Hertling was succeeded in office by the independent Otto von Dandl.

== German chancellor and Prussian minister president ==
Cabinet (1 November 1917 – 3 October 1918)
Office	Incumbent	In office	Party
Imperial Chancellor	Georg von Hertling	1 November 1917 – 3 October 1918	Centre
Vice-Chancellor	Karl Helfferich	22 May 1916 – 23 October 1917	None
Vice-Chancellor	Friedrich von Payer	9 November 1917 – 10 November 1918	FVP
Minister for Foreign Affairs	Richard von Kühlmann	6 August 1917 – 9 July 1918	None
Minister for Foreign Affairs	Paul von Hintze	9 July 1918 – 7 October 1918	None
Minister of the Interior	Max Wallraf	23 October 1917 – 6 October 1918	None
Justice Minister	Paul von Krause	7 August 1917 – 13 February 1919	None
Secretary of the Navy	Eduard von Capelle	15 March 1916 – 5 October 1918	None
Economics Minister	Rudolf Schwander	5 August 1917 – 20 November 1917	None
Economics Minister	Hans Karl von Stein zu Nord- und Ostheim	20 November 1917 – 8 November 1918	None
Secretary for Food	Wilhelm von Waldow	6 August 1917 – 9 November 1918	None
Secretary for the Post	Otto Rüdlin	6 August 1917 – 19 January 1919	None
Finance Minister	Siegfried von Roedern	22 May 1916 – 13 November 1918	None
Colonial Minister	Wilhelm Solf	20 November 1911 – 13 December 1918	None

Hertling belonged to the right wing of the Centre Party, which in contrast to its left rejected parliamentarization – that is, having ministers responsible to parliament rather than the emperor. He also feared that it would undermine federalism and strengthen the Social Democratic Party (SPD). Under his Reich chancellorship, the direction of the centre and of the left-liberal Progressive People's Party, both of which wanted to show consideration for the special rights of the German states, prevailed. Nevertheless, Hertling's government represented an important step towards the parliamentarization of the Reich, since the new chancellor had to reconcile his government program in advance with the majority parties of the Reichstag, the largest of which was the SPD with 35% of the seats, as compared to the centre's 16%. The centre was thus given time to become accustomed to "proto-parliamentary governance" and cooperation with the SPD and the left liberals.

With the left-wing liberal Friedrich von Payer of the Progressive People's Party as vice chancellor and Robert Friedberg of the National Liberal Party as deputy Prussian prime minister, two veteran parliamentarians were included in the cabinets as liaison men to the parties. The Social Democrats remained on the outside in order not to complicate the formation of a government. Friedrich von Payer was responsible for liaising between the SPD and the government.

During Hertling's term in office, some important steps were taken toward parliamentarization and democratization, such as an envisaged electoral reform with elements of proportional representation. Overall, however, the SPD was dissatisfied with him because the influence of the Supreme Army Command remained strong and reforms were slow. By the end of September 1918, Hertling had lost the confidence of the SPD, which wanted to enter the government only under a change of policy. The governments of Bavaria and Baden also thought that Hertling was not the right man to develop a consistent peace policy. The Progressive People's Party thought the same but did not want to endanger the coalition.

In view of the deteriorating military situation, the parties of the Inter-Party Committee, including Hertling's Centre Party, called for negotiations for a separate peace with the Allies that would not include annexations, as well as for parliamentarization of the Reich. Through a constitutional amendment, the government was to be made dependent on the confidence of the Reichstag. Hertling was determined to resist these demands. On 26 September 1918, however, department heads in the General Staff informed Paul von Hintze, state secretary in the Foreign Ministry, of the hopeless military situation, bypassing Quartermaster General Erich Ludendorff, but also failing to involve Reich Chancellor Hertling. Hintze worked out a concept for a revolution from above. When the Supreme Army Command also demanded a broader base for the government on 28 September – probably in order to place the responsibility for the defeat on the democratic parties – Hertling had no way out. The end of his chancellorship was sealed on 29 September at the army's general headquarters in Spa, Belgium. Hertling was succeeded on 3 October by Prince Maximilian of Baden, the preferred candidate of his vice chancellor, Payer.

Georg von Hertling died three months later in his adopted home of Ruhpolding, Bavaria, where he was buried.

== Orders and decorations ==
- Kingdom of Bavaria:
  - Knight of the Order of Merit of the Bavarian Crown, 1898
  - Grand Cross of the Royal Merit Order of Saint Michael, 1912
  - Knight of the Royal Order of Saint Hubert
  - King Ludwig Cross
- Baden: Grand Cross of the Order of Berthold the First, with Golden Collar
- Brunswick: Grand Cross of the Order of Henry the Lion
- Grand Duchy of Hesse: Grand Cross of the Merit Order of Philip the Magnanimous, with Crown
- Principality of Lippe: War Merit Cross
- Kingdom of Prussia:
  - Knight of the Order of the Red Eagle, 1st Class
  - Knight of the Royal Order of the Crown, 2nd Class with Star
  - Iron Cross (1914), 2nd Class on White Band with Black Edge
- Hohenzollern: Cross of Honour of the Princely House Order of Hohenzollern, 1st Class
- Kingdom of Saxony: Grand Cross of the Albert Order, with Golden Star
- Württemberg: Grand Cross of the Order of the Württemberg Crown
- (Austrian Empire) (Kingdom of Hungary) Austria-Hungary:
  - Grand Cross of the Austrian Imperial Order of Leopold, 1913; in Diamonds, 1914
  - Grand Cross of the Royal Hungarian Order of Saint Stephen, 1917
- Holy See:
  - Grand Cross of the Order of Pope Pius IX
  - Grand Cross of the Order of Saint Gregory the Great
- Finland: Grand Cross of the Order of the Cross of Liberty

== Sources ==
- Rauh, Manfred (1977). Die Parlamentarisierung des Deutschen Reiches [The Parliamentarization of the German Reich] (in German). Düsseldorf: Droste.

Political offices
Preceded by Clemens von Podewils-Dürniz	Prime Minister of Bavaria; 1912 – 1917	Succeeded by Otto Ritter von Dandl
Preceded by Georg Michaelis	Chancellor of Germany; 1917–1918	Succeeded by Prince Maximilian of Baden
Preceded by Georg Michaelis	Prime Minister of Prussia; 1917–1918	Succeeded by Prince Maximilian of Baden
