= Clemens von Delbrück =

German politician (1856–1921)

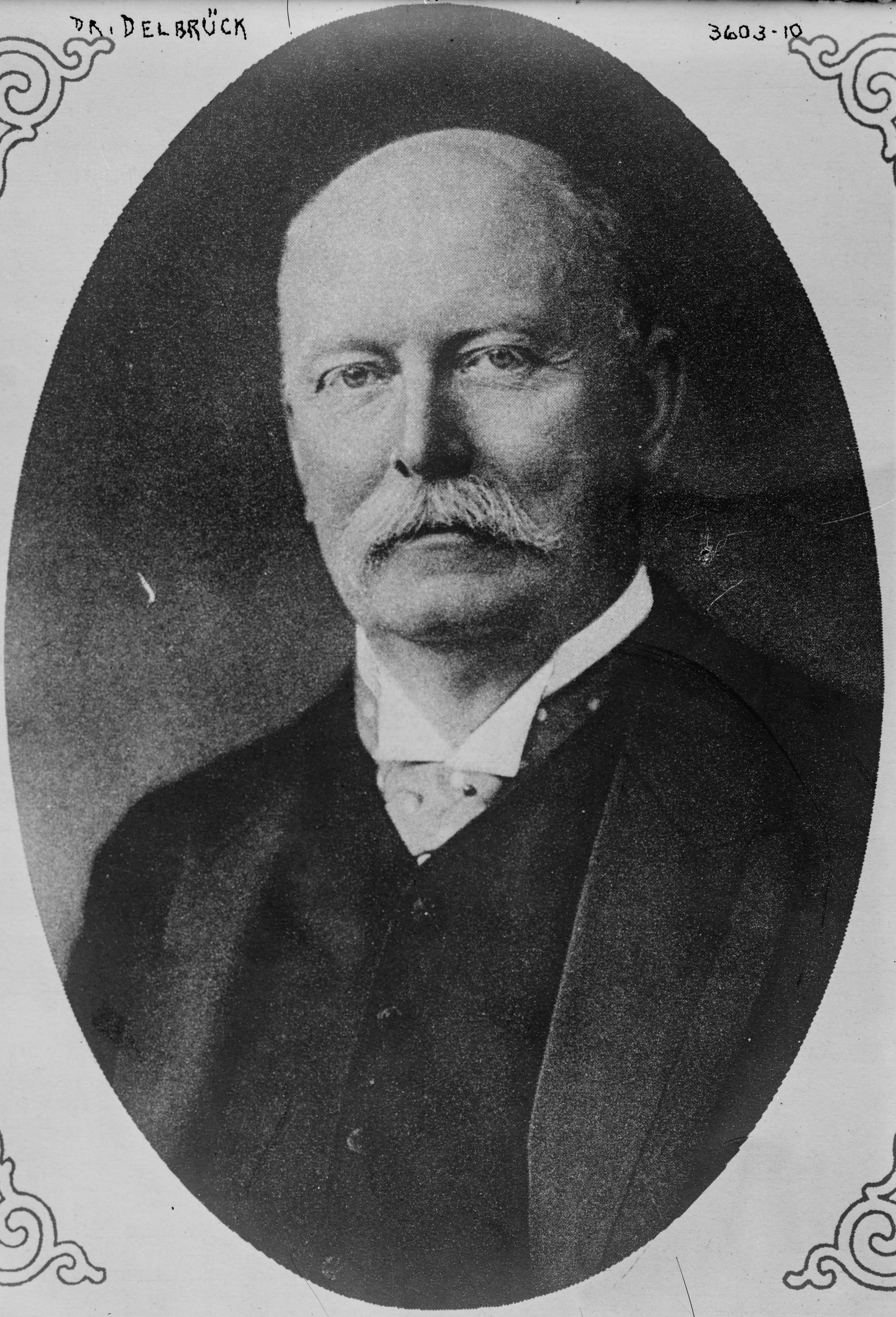

Vice-Chancellor of the German Empire
- In office 14 July 1909 – 22 May 1916
- Chancellor: Theobald von Bethmann Hollweg
- Preceded by: Theobald von Bethmann Hollweg
- Succeeded by: Karl Helfferich

Secretary of the Interior of the German Empire
- In office 14 July 1909 – 22 May 1916
- Preceded by: Theobald von Bethmann Hollweg
- Succeeded by: Karl Helfferich

Mayor of Danzig
- In office 1896–1902
- Preceded by: Karl Adolf Baumbach
- Succeeded by: Heinrich Otto Ehlers

Personal details
- Born: 19 January 1856
- Died: 17 December 1921 (aged 65)
- Party: None (until 1918), DNVP (1918–1921).

Clemens Ernst Gottlieb von Delbrück (German pronunciation: [ˈkleːməns fɔn ˈdɛl.bʁʏk]; 19 January 1856, in Halle an der Saale – 17 December 1921, in Jena) was a German conservative politician. He was ennobled in 1916.

== Early life ==
Delbrück was born into a common family, and attended high school in Halle between 1873 and 1877. He studied theology at the Ruprecht-Karls-Universität Heidelberg and law at the University of Berlin, which bestowed an honorary doctorate on him in 1912. In 1882, having passed the staatsexamen, he gained a government post in Kwidzyn.

== Career ==
Promoted to the office of Landrat (district administrator) of Tuchel in 1885, Delbrück became president of the city council of Danzig in 1891. From 1896 to 1902, he was Oberbürgermeister (mayor) of Danzig and sat in the Prussian House of Lords. He was the Oberpräsident of West Prussia from 1902 to 1905.

On 14 July 1909, Delbrück joined the national government as the minister of the interior and vice-chancellor in the cabinet of Theobald von Bethmann Hollweg. He also became vice-president of the Prussian ministry on 16 August 1914. In these positions he was distinguished by his strong opposition to the parliamentary system of the Reichstag but also his role in modernizing the German government. During the First World War, the increasing conflict between chancellor Bethmann Hollweg and leading figures in the German military, especially Generalfeldmarschall Paul von Hindenburg, led to Delbrück's replacement with Karl Helfferich on 22 May 1916.

== Later life ==
On his dismissal, Delbrück was awarded the Order of the Black Eagle and was given a letter assigning to him the status of hereditary nobleman. On 14 October 1918, he was made the head of the Kaiser's Geheimes Zivilkabinett (privy civil cabinet) before its dissolution with the fall of the German Empire on 11 November. A committed monarchist, he hoped to be able to retain the monarchy in the post-war democratic Germany.

Delbrück remained politically active after the war, and was a founding member of the conservative German National People's Party. He was a member of the Weimar National Assembly from 1919 to 1920, and of the Reichstag from 1920 until his death.

Political offices
Preceded by Theobald von Bethmann Hollweg	Vice Chancellor of Germany; 1909–1916	Succeeded by Karl Helfferich
