= Karl Helfferich =

German diplomat (1872–1924)

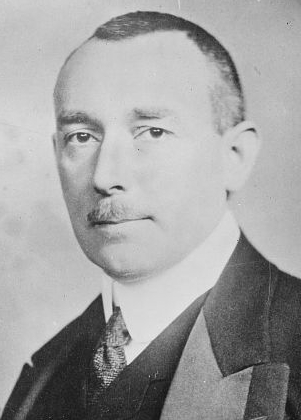
- Karl Helfferich

Vice-Chancellor of the German Empire
- In office 22 May 1916 – 24 October 1917
- Chancellor: Theobald von Bethmann Hollweg; Georg Michaelis; Georg von Hertling
- Preceded by: Clemens von Delbrück
- Succeeded by: Friedrich von Payer

Secretary of State of the Interior
- In office 22 May 1916 – 23 October 1917
- Chancellor: Theobald von Bethmann Hollweg; Georg Michaelis; Georg von Hertling
- Preceded by: Clemens von Delbrück
- Succeeded by: Max Wallraf

Secretary of State of the Treasury
- In office 21 January 1915 – 22 May 1916
- Chancellor: Theobald von Bethmann Hollweg
- Preceded by: Hermann Kühn
- Succeeded by: Siegfried von Roedern

Personal details
- Born: Karl Theodor Helfferich; 22 July 1872 Neustadt an der Weinstraße, Rhineland-Palatinate
- Died: 23 April 1924 (aged 51) Bellinzona, Switzerland
- Spouse(s): Annette, b. von Siemens
- Education: Friedrich Wilhelm University of Berlin; Ludwig-Maximilians-Universität München; University of Strasbourg
- Occupation: Lawyer, economist

Karl Theodor Helfferich (22 July 1872 – 23 April 1924) was a German politician, economist, and financier from Neustadt an der Weinstraße in the Palatinate.

== Biography ==
Helfferich studied law and political science at the Ludwig-Maximilians-Universität München, the Friedrich Wilhelm University of Berlin, and the University of Strasbourg. He taught at the Friedrich Wilhelm University of Berlin and later at the government school for colonial politics and oriental languages. In 1902, he entered upon a diplomatic career. He soon became a leader in the German government's policy of economic imperialism, and in 1906, he was appointed director of the Anatolian Railway which was financed by Deutsche Bank. In 1908, he was made chairman of the directorship of the powerful Deutsche Bank in Berlin.

At the close of the Balkan War, Helfferich was the German financial delegate to the international conference at London in 1913. He was the secretary for the Treasury from 1916 to 1917, and was said to be responsible for financing expenses for World War I through loans instead of taxes. He counted upon a final German victory and upon imposing heavy indemnities upon the Allies. He also served as the vice-chancellor for Chancellors Georg Michaelis and Georg von Hertling.

During the November Revolution, Helfferich became an early supporter of the self-proclaimed "national socialist" Eduard Stadtler and helped fund the founding of his Anti-Bolshevist League on December 1, 1918, receiving a cash donation of 5,000 marks from Paul Mankiewitz, the director of Deutsche Bank. This was the nucleus of the 500-million-mark Anti-Bolshevik Fund established by German industry on January 10, 1919, in Berlin. Money from this fund flowed into propagandistic anti-Bolshevik, later National Socialist projects, but also to violent groups such as the Freikorps, which were intended to crush the socialist movement after the November Revolution. Stadtler, the founder and leader of the Anti-Bolshevist League, according to his own account, arranged for the murder of Rosa Luxemburg and Karl Liebknecht on January 12, 1919, and broke "Gustav Noske's hesitance" about using the military in Berlin days before.

After the Treaty of Brest-Litovsk, Helfferich was sent to Moscow as the German Ambassador to Russia, succeeding Wilhelm Mirbach, who was assassinated. Elected to the Reichstag of 1920, Helfferich led the conservative and monarchist right, known as the Deutsch-Nationalen, and strongly opposed reparations and the economic fulfillment of the Versailles Treaty. In particular, he directed his denunciations against the democratic Catholic leader Matthias Erzberger, against whom he had a celebrated lawsuit in 1920.

The lawsuit was a substantial event in the Weimar Republic, and especially for Helfferich. After the publication of his seminal pamphlet Fort mit Erzberger! ('Away with Erzberger!') with respect to the prominent Weimar politician Matthias Erzberger in 1919, he began a very public political tirade smearing Erzberger's name. He accused Erzberger of financial improprieties, such as his financial decisions to use war bonds instead of taxes during the war and questioned his patriotism, focusing particularly on Erzberger's role in the armistice negotiations, which Helfferich and his nationalist supporters viewed as a betrayal of Germany. This all culminated in action when Erzberger filed formal suit against Helfferich citing libel in January 1920. After weeks of deliberation and statements, the presiding judge ruled in favor of Erzberger, forcing Helfferich to pay a fine of 300 marks. Despite losing the legal battle, in the eye of the German public, Helfferich and his right-wing political views were seen as the winner. After pressure from his own party, Erzberger was forced to resign his position as Finance Minister. In the eyes of the public, support had fully rallied behind Helfferich, mirroring the sway of the political climate during this tumultuous period. Unfortunately, tensions continued to rise against Erzberger until he was assassinated by two individuals who were directly tied to the Organization Consul.

Helfferich was a prominent politician of the German National People's Party (DNVP) and gave radical anti-republican speeches against politicians who supported the fulfilment of reparations. In June 1920, he was selected as spokesman in the Reichstag for the parliamentary committee of inquiry into policies during the war, which he defended.

During the 1923 hyperinflation, Helfferich developed a plan for a new rye currency, indexed to the price (in paper marks) of rye and other agricultural products. His plan was rejected because of the extreme variability in the price of rye compared to other commodities, but many of his plan elements were incorporated in the successful Rentenmark, which began circulation on 15 November 1923. At the end of 1923, when Helfferich applied for the post of Reichbank president, he was rejected in favor of Hjalmar Schacht.

Helfferich was killed in a railway wreck near Bellinzona, Switzerland, on 23 April 1924.

== Legacy ==
His publications comprise chiefly economic and political studies.

== Works ==
- The Reform of German Finance, 1897
- Studies on Money and Banking, 1900
- Money, 1903
- Germany's National Wealth 1888-1913, (Deutschlands Wohlstand, 1888-1913) 1915
- Speeches and Essays from the War, 1917
- Do Away with Erzberger!, Verlag Scherl, Berlin, 1919, letters to the editor, the Berlin newspaper "Tag"
- The World War, (Der Weltkrieg) (3 vols.) published 1919 by Ullstein Berlin

== See also ==
- Weimar Republic

Political offices
Preceded by Clemens von Delbrück	Vice Chancellor of Germany; 1916–1917	Succeeded by Friedrich von Payer
