= Friedrich von Payer =

German politician (1847–1931)

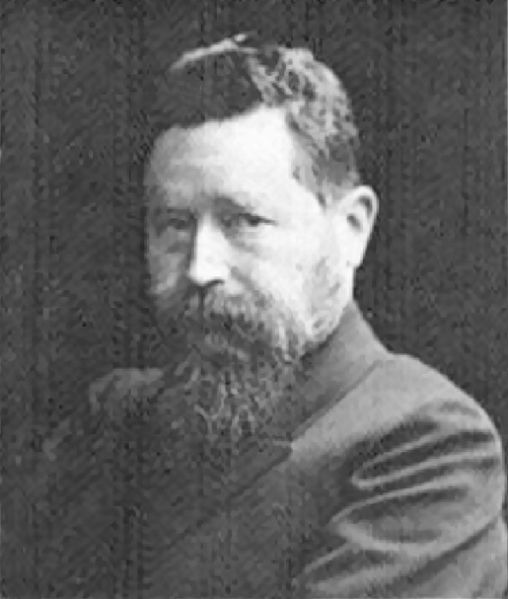

Vice-Chancellor of the German Empire
- In office 9 November 1917 – 10 November 1918
- Chancellor: Georg von Hertling; Maximilian of Baden; Friedrich Ebert
- Preceded by: Karl Helfferich
- Succeeded by: Eugen Schiffer

Member of the Reichstag for Tübingen-Reutlingen
- In office 1877–1878

Member of the Reichstag for Tübingen-Reutlingen
- In office 1880–1887

Member of the Reichstag for Tübingen-Reutlingen
- In office 1890–1918

Personal details
- Born: 12 June 1847; Tübingen, Kingdom of Württemberg
- Died: 14 July 1931 (aged 84); Stuttgart, Weimar Republic
- Political party: DVP (1907-1909), FVP (1909-1918), DDP (1918-1931)

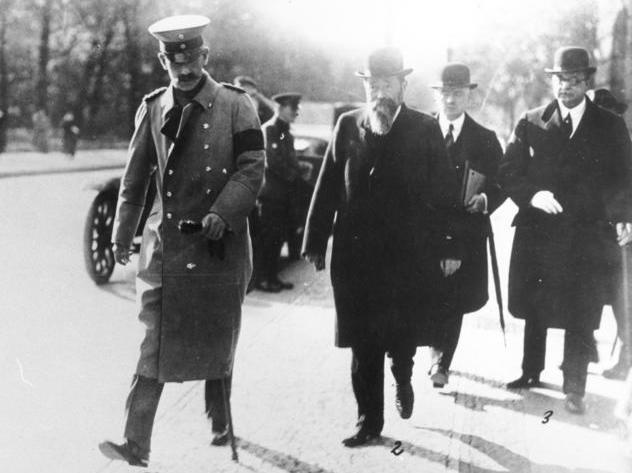
Freiderich von Payer (centre) with Max von Baden (left)

Friedrich Ludwig von Payer (12 June 1847 – 14 July 1931) was a German lawyer, liberal politician and the vice-chancellor of German Empire during the last year of World War I.

== Life ==
He was born in Tübingen and was educated at the seminary at Blaubeuren, returning to his home town to study law in 1865. Having completed his university education, he worked as a lawyer in Stuttgart and was first elected to the Reichstag in 1877. He reached the height of his political career during the First World War during which he advocated a negotiated peace with the allied powers and was appointed vice-chancellor. After the war, he was chairman of the German Democratic Party and remained a member of the new Weimar Reichstag until 6 June 1920. Payer married Alwine Schöninger.

Preceded by Karl Helfferich	Vice Chancellor of Germany; 1917–1918	Succeeded by Eugen Schiffer on 13 February 1919
