= Siegfried von Roedern =

German politician

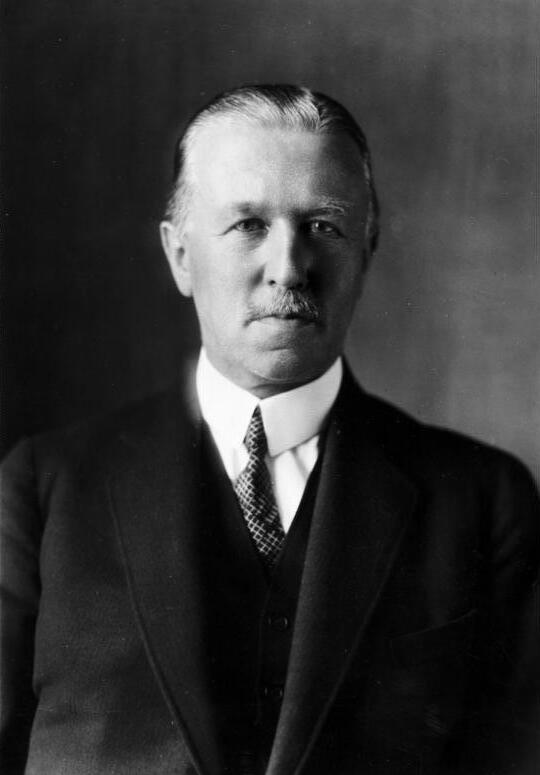
Siegfried von Roedern, 1916

Siegfried Friedrich Wilhelm Erdmann Graf von Roedern (27 July 1870 in Marburg – 14 April 1954 in Bergen, Upper Bavaria), was a German politician. He served as Secretary in the Ministry for Alsace-Lorraine from 1914 to 1916, and as Secretary for the Treasury and Minister of State (1916–1918).

A member of a noble Prussian family, he studied law in Freiburg, Berlin, Geneva and Marburg and became a lawyer in 1893. For most of his career, he was a civil servant.

== Literature ==
- Claudia Wilke: Die Landräte der Kreise Teltow und Niederbarnim im Kaiserreich: Eine biographisch-verwaltungsgeschichtliche Studie zur Leistungsverwaltung in der Provinz Brandenburg. Verlag für Berlin-Brandenburg, Potsdam 1998, ISBN 978-3-930850-70-9.
- Rudolf Vierhaus: Deutsche biographische Enzyklopädie (dbe)

Political offices
Preceded by Karl Helfferich	Secretary for the Treasury of Germany; 1916–1918	Succeeded by Eugen Schiffer (as Minister of Finance)
