= Karl von Wedel =

Prussian general and diplomat (1842–1919)

His Serene Highness The Prince of Wedel
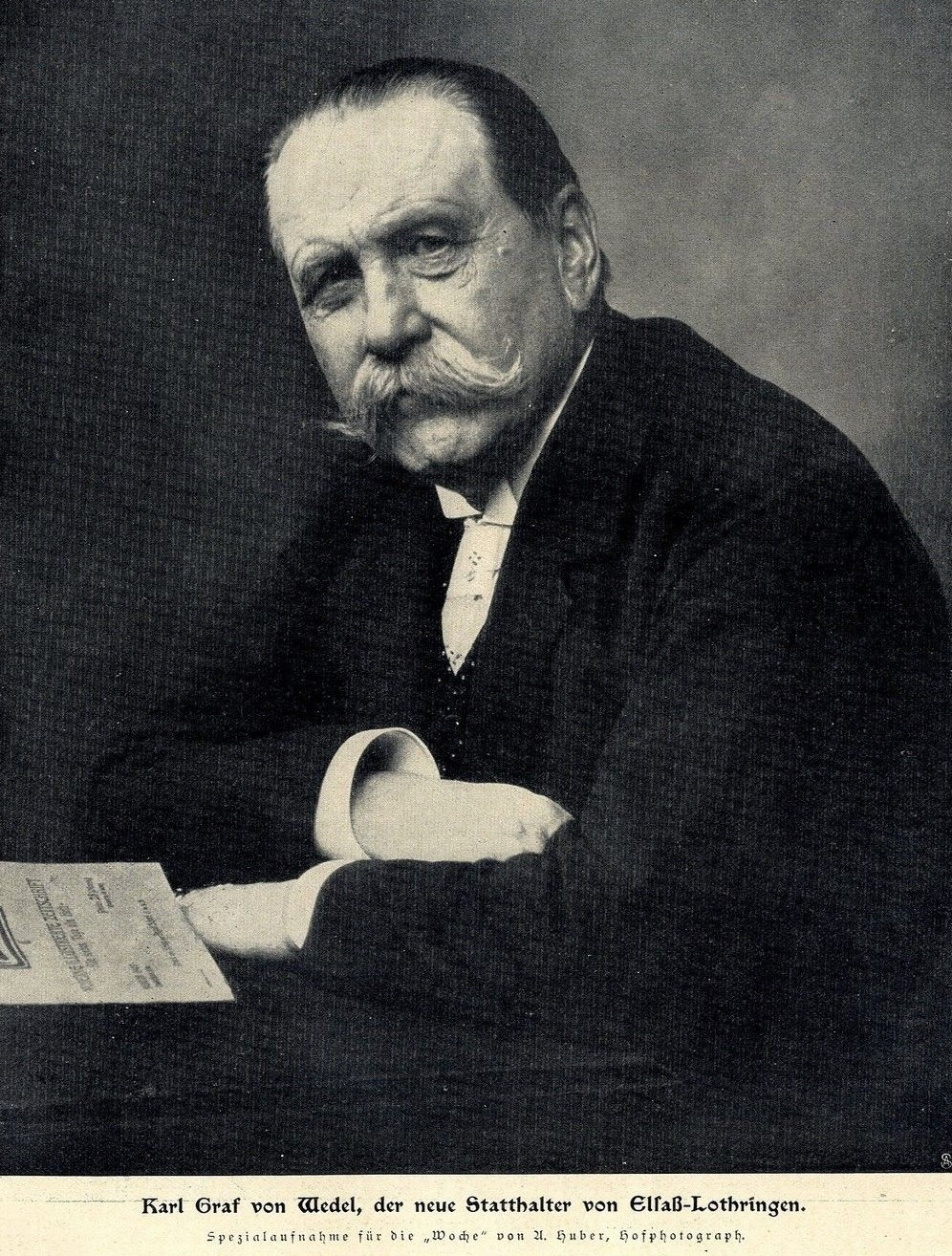
- Photograph c. 1907

4th Imperial Lieutenant of Alsace–Lorraine
- In office 27 October 1907 – 18 April 1914
- Monarch: Wilhelm II
- Preceded by: Hermann, Prince of Hohenlohe-Langenburg
- Succeeded by: Johann von Dallwitz

Personal details
- Born: Karl Leo Julius von Wedel; 5 February 1842 Ostenburg, Grand Duchy of Oldenburg
- Died: 30 December 1919 (aged 77) Eskilstuna, Södermanland, Sweden
- Spouse: Stephanie von Platen (m. 1894)
- Occupation: Soldier • diplomat • politician
- Awards: Langensalza Medal; Order of the Black Eagle; Iron Cross

Military service
- Allegiance: Kingdom of Hanover; Kingdom of Prussia; German Empire
- Branch/service: Hanoverian Army; Prussian Army; Imperial German Army
- Years of service: 1859–1894
- Rank: General der Cavallerie
- Commands: 2nd Guards Uhlans; 1st Guards Cavalry
- Battles/wars: Second Schleswig War Austro-Prussian War: Battle of Langensalza; Franco-Prussian War

Karl, Prince of Wedel (German: Karl Fürst von Wedel; 5 February 1842 – 30 December 1919), born Karl Leo Julius Graf von Wedel, was a Prussian general and diplomat who served as the fourth Imperial Lieutenant (German: Reichsstatthalter) of the Reichsland of Alsace–Lorraine from 27 October 1907 until his resignation on 18 April 1914.

Formerly a soldier in the Hanoverian Army, Wedel entered the service of the Prussian Army after Hanover's defeat in the Austro-Prussian War, subsequently rising through the ranks. In addition to his military roles, he also served in various governmental posts before eventually succeeding Prince Hermann zu Hohenlohe-Langenburg as Reichsstatthalter. Wedel inherited from his predecessor a province troubled by conflict between French and German nationalists and the question of its place in the empire, though his open-minded disposition did much to ingratiate himself towards the Alsatians. It was under his auspices that the Constitution of 1911—which granted semi-statehood to Alsace–Lorraine—was enacted.

Wedel was forced to resign following the Zabern Affair, the incident severely damaging relations between Alsace–Lorraine and the rest of the German states, as well as tarnishing the reputation of the Kaiser and, by extension, Prussian militarism. He continued to carry out his diplomatic duties until Germany's defeat in the First World War and the November Revolution, after which he retired with his wife to Stora Sundby Castle in Sweden, where he died the following year. He is remembered as a liberal ruler and conciliator in the same vein as Edwin von Manteuffel and Prince Chlodwig zu Hohenlohe-Schillingsfürst.

== Family ==
Born into the ancient Holsteinian noble House of Wedel, he was the youngest child and son of Count Friedrich Wilhelm von Wedel (1798–1872), a lieutenant general in the Oldenburg army who was head of the Department of Military Affairs and chief of staff to Grand Duke Peter II, and his wife Baroness Wilhelmine Bertha Sophie von Glaubitz (1802–1887). His father's family had branches in Denmark and Norway; among his relatives were Wilhelm von Wedell-Piesdorf, Baroness Charlotte Wedell-Wedellsborg, and Baron Fritz Wedel-Jarlsberg.

In 1894, Wedel married in Stockholm the prominent Countess Stephanie Augusta von Platen, née Hamilton af Hageby (1852–1937), a member of the Swedish branch of the Scottish Clan Hamilton; the marriage was childless. Stephanie was widely-known for her accommodating and empathic nature, as well as her contributions to charity and animal welfare; for this she was included among Europe's "grand dames".

== Career ==
=== In service to Hanover ===
Wedel enlisted in the Hanoverian Army's Guards Regiment in May 1859 before transferring to the Kronprinz Dragoner-Regiment in June of that year as a first lieutenant, first seeing action in the Second Schleswig-Holstein War. During the Austro-Prussian War, Hanover fought on the side of Austria; Wedel took part in the Battle of Langensalza, for which he was awarded the Langensalza Medal by King George V. After Prussia's victory and its annexation of Hanover, which resulted in the absorption of the Hanoverian Army into its armed forces, Wedel was commissioned as an officer for a second time by patent in the service of Prussia in November 1866. He joined the 8th (1st Westphalian) Hussars Regiment, (Note: Some sources erroneously list it as the 2nd Guards Uhlans Regiment.) and by January 1870 had risen to the rank of Rittmeister.

=== In service to Prussia ===
When war broke out between Prussia and France in July 1870, Wedel was an active participant as an adjutant in the 25th Hessian Cavalry Brigade, which saw him awarded the Iron Cross 2nd Class. He was later appointed adjutant on General Count Wilhelm zu Stolberg-Wernigerode's staff of the VII Army Corps' General Command at Münster, before being promoted to major and transferred to the German General Staff in 1876. While serving as a military observer at Russian headquarters during the Russo-Turkish War, he was appointed military attaché to the German embassy in Vienna; in that time he was made aide-de-camp to Kaiser Wilhelm I in 1879 and promoted to colonel in 1886. At the signing of the Treaty of San Stefano in 1878, he was part of the German legation, overseeing the negotiations over the borders between the newly created Principality of Bulgaria and Eastern Rumelia.

As a member of the Kaiser's inner circle, Wedel found himself involved in various court intrigues. In 1885 he met with Alexander, Prince of Bulgaria, who was in Vienna to observe the ongoing military exercises at Pilsen. During their conversation, Alexander mentioned—as Wedel recounted in his letter to Friedrich von Holstein, then-Councilor of Legation in the German Foreign Office—the proposed betrothal made four years ago between him and the crown prince's daughter Princess Viktoria, and how he had made an official declaration renouncing the betrothal under the Kaiser's orders, with Viktoria allegedly making a similar declaration. This incurred the wrath of the crown prince couple and exacerbated the already deep enmity between them and the Bismarcks, as they assumed Wedel had written the letter under Herbert von Bismarck's instigation. The crown princess herself would later refer to Wedel, among others, as "dreadful", "selfish", "ambitious", "dangerous", and "very pernicious".

Upon his return from Vienna in March 1887, Wedel was given command of the 2nd Guards Uhlans and later, the 1st Guards Cavalry Regiments. In 1889, in addition to his promotion to major general, he was appointed Flügeladjutant and made general à la Suite in the court of the new Kaiser, Wilhelm II. During that time he was sent to various courts in Europe on diplomatic matters until 1891, when he was transferred to the German Foreign Office. He later recounted that he initially felt like "a fifth wheel" and hoped that he would soon be assigned an ambassadorial post.

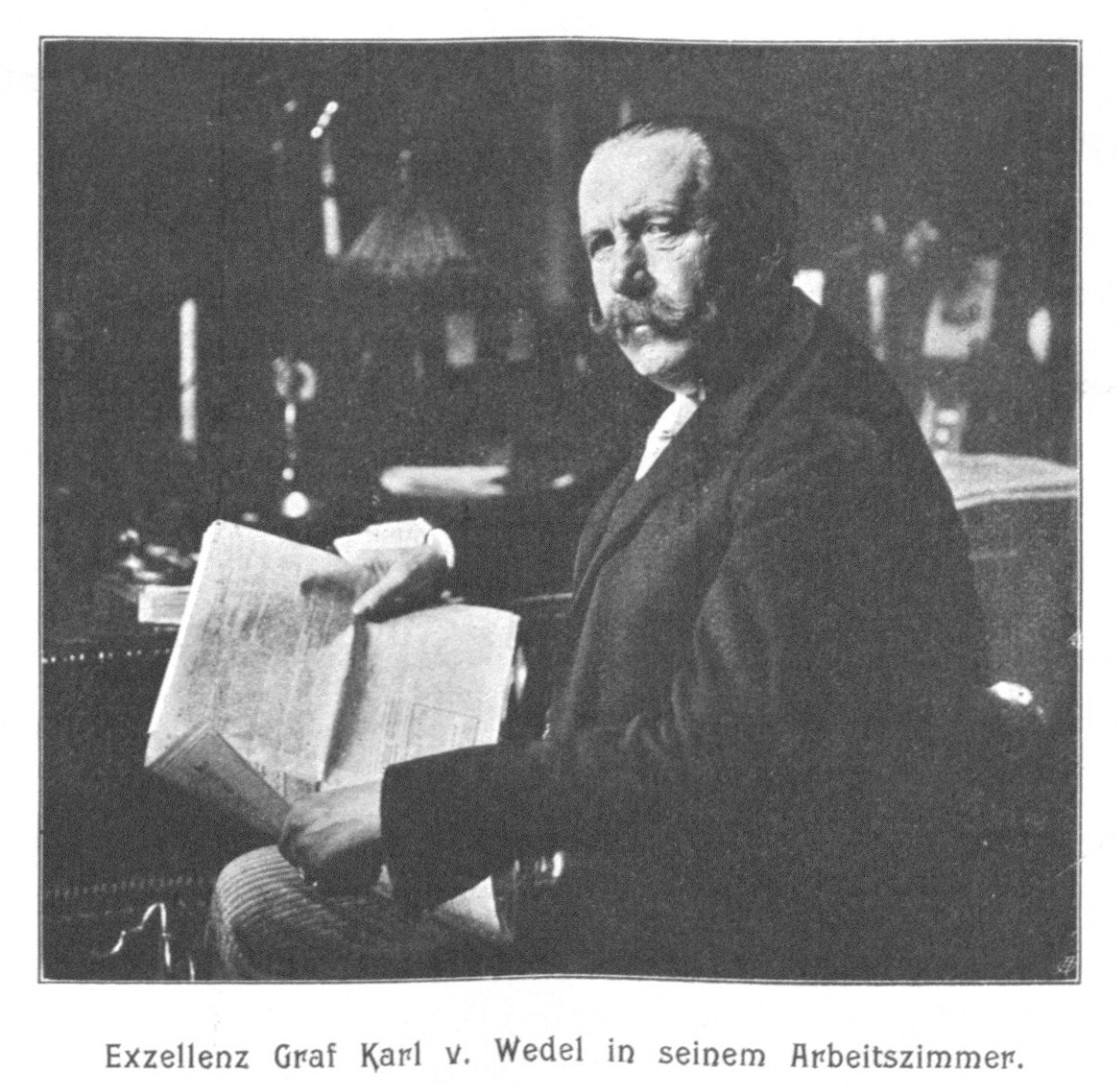
Count Wedel in his office as ambassador to Vienna, c.1903.

In 1892, Wedel was promoted again to lieutenant general and raised to adjutant general to the Kaiser. Under Philipp zu Eulenberg and Holstein, he was sent as an envoy to Stockholm in order to mediate in the steadily escalating conflicts in the Swedish-Norwegian union. A year later he would also organize the Kaiser's first trip to Scandinavia on board the new imperial yacht, the SMY Hohenzollern—which, out of diplomatic considerations at Wedel's advice, did not visit the Norwegian coast, instead heading to Sweden and visiting Gotland, among other places. It was during his stay in Sweden that he met his future wife; after their marriage, he went into temporary retirement from the military. He was recalled to active service in 1897, whereupon he was promoted to General of the Cavalry and appointed Governor of Berlin.

For the next few years he would serve as an ambassador for Germany, firstly to Italy in 1899 and later to Austria-Hungary in 1902. While in Vienna, he met and mentored the future Foreign Minister of the Weimar Republic, Ulrich von Brockdorff-Rantzau, at that time a worker at the embassy.

== Reichstatthalter of Alsace-Lorraine ==
In 1907, Count Wedel was appointed viceroy of Alsace-Lorraine by the Kaiser, following the resignation of Prince Hohenlohe-Langenburg. This was met with mixed reactions, with Holstein opposing the decision on the grounds of Wedel being a supporter of home rule, which he felt would undermine Berlin's influence. Holstein was also doubtful of Wedel's reliability, citing his past as a Hanoverian soldier. Others, namely Imperial Chancellor Prince Bernhard von Bülow, supported the move, as he favored Wedel's more restrained foreign policy in contrast to that of pro-French diplomats such as Prince Hatzfeldt and Radowitz. In a letter to Holstein, Bülow stated that:

Certain characteristics of behavior and a certain financial position are necessary in the Reich territories which are less important in the rest of Germany. . . . [Wedel] possesses a quality particularly appropriate for Strasbourg, he has dignity. He will not run after the French. He is far too reserved to do that. Besides, I have a stronger influence on him, who may some day become Reich Chancellor but who bona fide does not aspire to the post, than I have on people who regard Strasbourg merely as a stepping stone to Berlin.

Despite his loyalty to Berlin and his concerns over pro-French sentiment in the province, Wedel was sympathetic towards the Alsatians. "The people of this Land have, as do other German tribes", he declared, "the right to maintain their own special character." This, along with his moderate governance, won him the respect of even the French-speaking populace. His wife, Countess Stephanie, was just as popular, with the Alsatians even coming to regard her as a national mother-figure.

Wedel's tenure, however, ran into trouble at the end of 1913, when a Prussian soldier insulted the entire Alsatian populace, with the military committing illegal acts in response to the protests. Though Wedel did his best to mitigate the incident, the Kaiser's apparent bias towards the military received backlash across the country. This left the Strasbourg government little choice but to resign on 29 January 1914. Wedel himself stepped down on 18 April of that year; initially, the Kaiser suggested one of his sons as his successor, though nothing came of it. He eventually appointed Johann von Dallwitz, whose authoritarian policies and rejection of the constitution would only serve to further alienate the Alsatians. On the day of his resignation, Wedel was elevated by the Kaiser to the status of Prince (Fürst).

After his departure from office, Wedel was once again appointed adjutant general to the Kaiser, a position he held throughout the First World War. During that time, he also served as ambassador to Vienna and Bucharest; from 1916 he advocated a negotiated peace with the Allies, and was a staunch opponent of unrestricted submarine warfare. In July of that year he became president of the pro-government Nationalausschusses für einen ehrenhaften Frieden (German National Committee for an Honorable Peace), which opposed the annexationism endorsed by right-wing circles. For a time, the German government considered sending Wedel on a diplomatic mission to Stockholm, due to his good relations with Sweden from his time as envoy and through his wife. Though that plan never came to pass, Prince Wedel would move there upon his full retirement.

== Titles, honours and awards ==
- Granted the title of Prince, 18 April 1914

German orders and decorations

- Hanover: Langensalza Medal, 27 July 1866
- Prussia:
  - Iron Cross (1870), 2nd Class on Black Band
  - Service Award Cross
  - Knight of Honour of the Johanniter Order, 17 February 1872; Knight of Justice, 1883
  - Knight of the Royal Crown Order, 3rd Class with Swords, 1878; 2nd Class with Swords on Ring, 3 January 1886; 1st Class
  - Knight's Cross of the Royal House Order of Hohenzollern, 1 January 1883; Grand Commander's Cross
  - Knight of the Red Eagle, 3rd Class with Bow, 22 March 1884; 2nd Class with Oak Leaves, 1890; with Star, 4 March 1893; Grand Cross with Crown, 27 January 1899
  - Knight of the Black Eagle, with Collar and in Brilliants, 18 January 1903
- Hohenzollern: Cross of Honour of the Princely House Order of Hohenzollern, 1st Class
- Anhalt: Commander of the Order of Albert the Bear, 1st Class, 1889
- Baden: Knight of the House Order of Fidelity, 1908
- Bavaria:
  - Knight of St. Hubert, 1908
  - Commander of the Military Merit Order
- Brunswick: Grand Cross of the Order of Henry the Lion
- (Saxe-Coburg and Gotha) (Duchy of Saxe-Altenburg) (Saxe-Meiningen) Ernestine duchies: Grand Cross of the Saxe-Ernestine House Order
- Saxony:
  - Commander of the Albert Order, 2nd Class, 1882; Grand Cross with Star in Gold, 1898
  - Knight of the Rue Crown
- Lippe-Detmold: Cross of Honour of the House Order of Lippe, 1st Class
- Oldenburg: Knight of the Order of Duke Peter Friedrich Ludwig, 2nd Class with Swords, 16 January 1871; Grand Commander of Honour
- Mecklenburg:
  - Military Merit Cross, 2nd Class (Schwerin)
  - Grand Cross of the Griffon (Schwerin)
  - Grand Cross of the Wendish Crown, with Crown in Gold
- Saxe-Weimar-Eisenach: Grand Cross of the White Falcon, 1893
- Schwarzburg: Princely Schwarzburg Cross of Honour, 1st Class
- Württemberg:
  - Commander of the Friedrich Order, 1st Class, 1889
  - Grand Cross of the Württemberg Crown, 1898
- Hesse and by Rhine:
  - Military Merit Cross, 30 January 1871
  - Knight of the Merit Order of Philip the Magnanimous, 1st Class, 28 October 1871; Commander 1st Class with Swords, 7 December 1889
  - Grand Cross of the Ludwig Order, 16 March 1908

Foreign orders and decorations

- (Austrian Empire) (Kingdom of Hungary) Austria-Hungary:
  - Knight of the Iron Crown, 2nd Class, 1881; 1st Class, 1891
  - Knight of the Royal Hungarian Order of St. Stephen, 1884; Grand Cross, 1903; in Brilliants, 1907
  - Commander of the Order of Franz Joseph, with Star, 1887; Grand Cross, 1889
- Denmark: Grand Cross of the Dannebrog, 4 March 1891
- Kingdom of Italy: Grand Cross of Saints Maurice and Lazarus
- Belgium: Grand Officer of the Order of Leopold
- Netherlands: Grand Cross of the Order of Orange-Nassau
- Siam: Grand Cross of the White Elephant
- Sweden-Norway:
  - Commander Grand Cross of the Sword, 2 July 1890; with Collar, 20 September 1897
  - Grand Cross of St. Olav, 12 September 1894
- Principality of Romania:
  - Officer of the Star of Romania, with Swords; Grand Cross
  - Military Virtue Medal
- Russian Empire:
  - Knight of St. Vladimir, 4th Class with Swords
  - Knight of St. Stanislaus, 1st Class
  - Knight of St. Alexander Nevsky
- Luxembourg: Knight of the Gold Lion of Nassau, 9 November 1912

=== Military appointments ===
- À la suite of the 2nd Guards Uhlan Regiment, 25 January 1899

== Notes ==
Political offices
Preceded by Hermann, Prince of Hohenlohe-Langenburg	Reichsstatthalter of Alsace-Lorraine; 1907-1914	Succeeded by Johann von Dallwitz
German nobility
New title	Prince of Wedel; 1914-1919	Extinct
