= Erich Prigge =

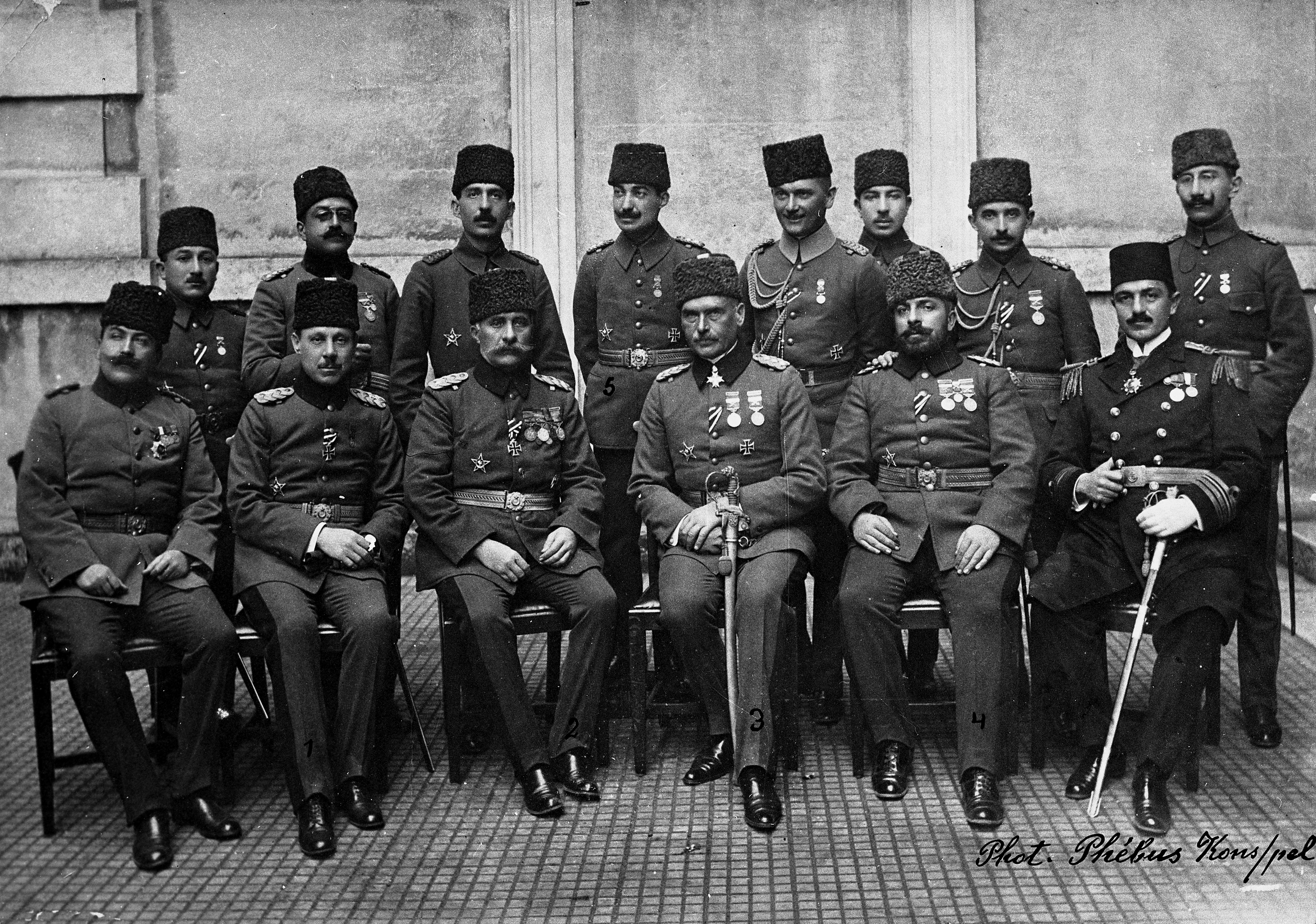
- Photograph of senior Ottoman military personnel and staff officers who served in the Dardanelles Campaign (1915): Erich Prigge, back row, fourth from right

Erich Prigge (1878–1955) was a German army officer, who served in both the German Imperial Army and the Ottoman Army during World War I, and ultimately attained the rank of major. Prigge is best known as the long-serving adjutant to Marshal Otto Liman von Sanders (1914–19) and as a military memoirist.

Erich Richard Julius Prigge was born on 19 March 1878 at Harsefeld in the Prussian Province of Hanover. His parents were from bourgeois families of the Rhine Province, distinguished in business and provincial administration. He was primarily raised by paternal relatives in Magdeburg. He was a cousin once removed of René König.

== Military career ==
=== Education and pre-WWI years ===
Destined for a military career from an early age, Prigge attended a regional cadet school (Kadettenschule), followed by two years’ instruction (1894-6) at the Central Cadet Institution (Hauptkadettenanstalt) at Groß-Lichterfelde. In 1896 he was posted to the 2. Rheinisches Husaren-Regiment Nr. 9, stationed at Trier, later relocated to Strassburg. Following a mandatory course at a War School (Kriegsschule), in 1897 he received his commission as Sekondelieutenant. In 1904-6 he was posted to the Military Riding Institute (Militärreitinstitut) in Hanover. Thereafter he served as an inspection officer (Inspektionsoffizier) at the War Schools in Neisse and Glogau. He was promoted to Oberleutnant on 1908 and transferred to the War School in Potsdam, where he served as a riding instructor (Reitlehrer). In January 1913 he was promoted to Rittmeister and transferred to the Ulanen-Regiment von Schmidt (1. Pommersches) Nr. 4, based at Thorn.

In February 1914 Prigge retired from active duty in the Prussian Army prior to his transferral to the German Military Mission (Militärmission) to the Ottoman Empire. On arrival in Istanbul, he was appointed commanding officer of the Ottoman Cavalry Non-Commissioned Officers’ School at Ayazağa. As a Rittmeister in the Prussian army, he was accorded the one-higher rank of Binbaşı (Major) in the Ottoman Army.

=== First World War ===
On the outbreak of World War I in Europe in August 1914, Prigge was appointed as an adjutant to Marshal Liman von Sanders, a post he retained, with brief interruptions, until the end of the war. After Liman von Sanders was appointed commander-in-chief of the newly created Ottoman Fifth Army in March 1915, Prigge served at its headquarters on the Gallipoli Peninsula throughout the Dardanelles campaign. In May 1915 he was awarded the Iron Cross (First Class). In September 1915, he was instructed to write a semi-official account of the fighting, primarily to counter British propaganda. Completed even before the conclusion of combat operations, and based partly of personal observation, partly on official documentation and eyewitness reports, this narrative was published at the beginning of 1916 as Der Kampf um die Dardanellen (The Struggle for the Dardanelles). It is as one of the earliest published accounts of the campaign written by a combatant. After a few months on sale in Germany, a complaint from the Ottoman General Headquarters that its content compromised military security induced the German authorities to order the book’s confiscation. Later in 1916, a revised and expurgated version of Prigge’s text was anonymously published as Gallipoli, der Kampf um den Orient (Gallipoli, the Struggle for the Orient), attributed to 'an officer of the staff of Marshal Liman von Sanders'. Subsequently, Prigge remained with Liman von Sanders as his adjutant until 1919, apart from a tenth-month secondment to the Eastern Front in 1917. His final theatre of operations was in Palestine, where Liman von Sanders commanded the Yıldırım Army Group (1 March-30 October 1918). In April 1918, Prigge was promoted to major temporarily without commission in the Prussian army, and correspondingly ranked as Kaymakam (Oberstleutnant) in the Ottoman Army. During the final phase of the campaign, he briefly served as acting chief of staff to the Army Group.

=== Interbellum ===
Following the Armistice of Mudros, Prigge returned to Germany in early 1919 and retired from the army with the rank of Major (ret.). He resided in Berlin, where he married and pursued diverse business interests. He was a member of the Bund der Asienkämpfer, later serving as its vice-chairman (c.1932-4). He remained well connected in political-military circles and participated in diplomatic activities involving the Republic of Turkey and Balkan countries.

=== Second World War and after ===
During World War II he was conscripted into the Wehrmacht as a reserve officer (1940–44) and exercised various administrative functions in Baden. After the war, he became managing director of the Badisches Hilfswerk and subsequently of the Red Cross in Baden. He died at Locarno on 1 February 1955.

== Writings ==
- Maj. Erich R. Prigge, Der Kampf um die Dardanellen (Verlag Gustav Kiepenheuer: Weimar 1916), pp. 112; English translation: P. Rance, The Struggle for the Dardanelles. The Memoirs of a German Staff Officer in Ottoman Service (Pen & Sword 2017), pp. 145–234.
- Anonymous [E.R. Prigge], Gallipoli, Der Kampf um den Orient. Von einem Offizier aus dem Stabe des Marschalls Liman von Sanders (Verlag August Scherl: Berlin 1916), pp. 117; English translation: P. Rance, The Struggle for the Dardanelles. The Memoirs of a German Staff Officer in Ottoman Service (Pen & Sword 2017), pp. 235–306.
- Erich R. Prigge, "Die Kampfhandlungen in der Türkei" in: M. Schwarte (ed.), Der große Krieg 1914-1918, 10 vols. (Leipzig 1921-33) IV (1922), pp. 413–84
- Erich Prigge, "Kiasim-Pascha", Orient Rundschau 14.5 (May 1933), p. 45
