= Dallwitz =

Dallwitz is a German surname. Notable people with the surname include:

- Burkhard Dallwitz (born 1959), German composer
- Dave Dallwitz (1914–2003), Australian musician, painter and art teacher
- Johann von Dallwitz (1855–1919), German politician
- Dallwitz, the German name for Dalovice (Karlovy Vary District), a village in Karlovy Vary District, Czech Republic
