= Otto Liman von Sanders =

German general (1855–1929)

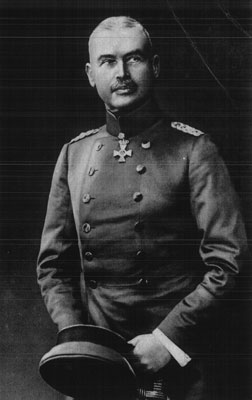
- Born: Otto Viktor Karl Liman; 17 February 1855; Stolp, Pomerania, Kingdom of Prussia (now Słupsk, Poland)
- Died: 22 August 1929 (aged 74); Munich, Bavaria, Weimar Republic
- Burial place: Darmstadt, Germany
- Spouses: Amelie Lily Karoline Gabriele von Sanders (1858–1906); Elisabeth Alberti
- Military career
- Allegiance: German Empire; Ottoman Empire
- Branch: Imperial German Army; Ottoman Army
- Service years: 1874–1918
- Rank: General of the Cavalry (Germany); Field Marshal (Ottoman Empire)
- Units: Grossherzoglich-Hessisches Infanterie-Regiment Nr. 115; Dragoner-Regiment Nr. 23
- Commands: I. Armee-Korps; 22nd Division; Husaren-Regiment Nr. 6; Fifth Army (Ottoman Empire); Yildirim Army Group (Ottoman Empire)
- Conflicts: World War I: Gallipoli campaign; Sinai and Palestine campaign
- Awards: Pour le Mérite with Oak Leaves

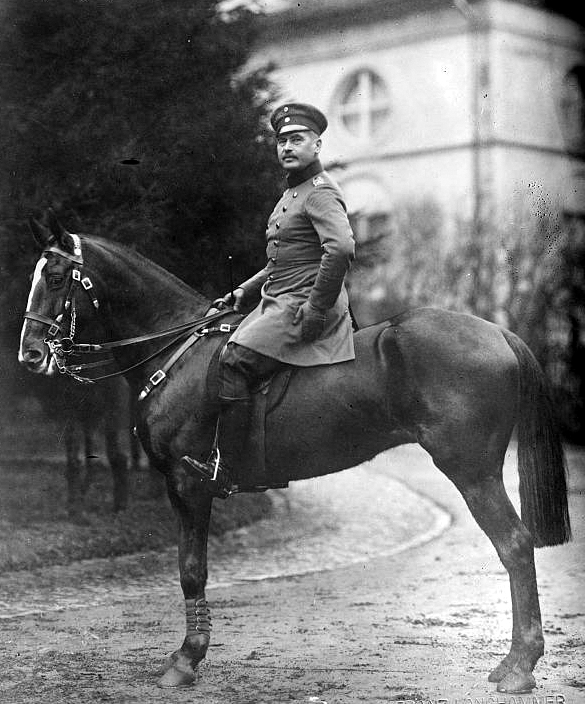
Generalleutnant Otto Liman von Sanders at the Ottoneum in Kassel circa 1913

Otto Viktor Karl Liman von Sanders (German: [ˈɔtoː ˈliːman fɔn ˈzandɐs]; 17 February 1855 – 22 August 1929) was an Imperial German Army general who served as a military adviser to the Ottoman Army during the First World War. He joined the military and rose through the ranks to General.

He led the Gallipoli campaign in 1915-1916 and in 1918 he commanded an Ottoman army during the Sinai and Palestine Campaign.

== Early life and career ==
Otto Liman was born in Stolp (now Słupsk, Poland) in the Province of Pomerania in the Kingdom of Prussia. He was the son of Carl Leonhard Liman and his wife Emma née Michaelis. Carl Liman was a prosperous businessman, who purchased the lordship of the manor (Rittergut) of Schwessin (now Świeszyno, Poland). It is generally agreed that Carl's father (Otto's grandfather) was born to a Jewish family by the name of Liepmann and was later baptised a Christian.

After gaining his diploma (Abitur) at the Friedrich Wilhelm Gymnasium in Berlin, Otto Liman entered the army on 13 March 1874 as a Fahnenjunker in the Leibgarde-Infanterie-Regiment (1. Grossherzöglich Hessisches) Nr. 115. From 1878 to 1881 he attended the Military Academy (Kriegsakademie) in Berlin, and was subsequently transferred to Garde-Dragoner-Regiment (1. Grossherzöglich Hessisches) Nr. 23. In 1885 he was promoted to Oberleutnant and in 1887 seconded to the General Staff. Promoted to Hauptmann in 1889, he was appointed a squadron commander (Eskadronschef) in 1891. In 1900 he was assigned command of Husaren-Regiment "Graf Goetzen" (2. Schlesisches) Nr. 6, first as Major, and from 1904 as Oberst. He was promoted to Generalmajor in 1908 and given command of the 22nd Division, based at Kassel. He attained the rank of Generalleutnant in 1911.

On 16 June 1913, on the occasion of the 25th Jubilee of Kaiser Wilhelm II, Liman was ennobled. As his nobiliary suffix he chose the maiden name of his late first wife, Amelie von Sanders (1858–1906). He was thereafter known as Otto Liman von Sanders. In accordance with the rules of German nomenclature, this surname is correctly abbreviated "Liman" (and not "von Sanders" or "Sanders", as is often the case in English-language publications).

== German Military Mission to the Ottoman Empire and World War I ==
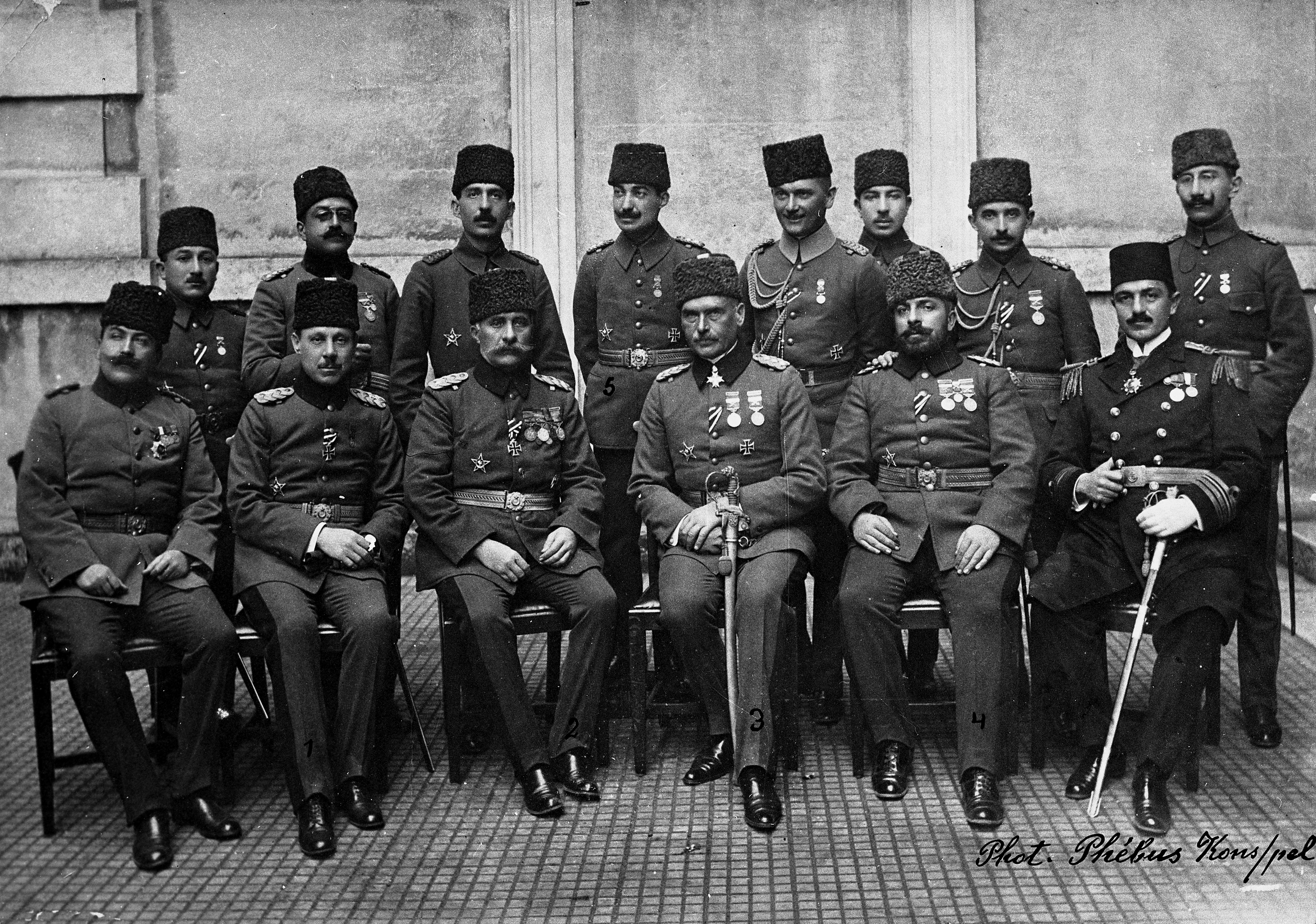
Ottoman general staff of the Sinai and Palestine Campaign, 1914 (Sanders sitting middle)

In 1913, like several other Prussian generals before him (such as Moltke and Goltz), Liman was appointed to head a German military mission to the Ottoman Empire. For nearly eighty years, the Ottomans had been trying to modernize their army along European lines. Liman von Sanders would be the last German to attempt this task.

On 30 July 1914, two days after the outbreak of the war in Europe, the Ottoman leaders agreed to form an alliance with Germany against Russia, although it did not require them to undertake military action, and on 31 October 1914, the Ottoman Empire officially entered the war on the side of the Central Powers. Britain and France declared war on it on 5 November, and the Ottomans declared a jihad (holy war) later that month, but the call for jihad failed as many of the Arab nationalists formed an alliance with the British (which led to the Arab Revolt).

=== Gallipoli ===
The first proposal to attack the Ottoman Empire was made in November 1914 by the French Minister of Justice Aristide Briand and was rejected. Later that month Winston Churchill, First Lord of the Admiralty, proposed a naval attack on the Dardanelles, based in part on erroneous reports of Ottoman troop strength. An initial attempt to force the Dardanelles by sea failed on 18 March 1915, due to gunfire from Ottoman forts on both sides of the strait. The Allies then turned to planning amphibious operations to capture the forts and clear the strait, which led to the Battle of Gallipoli.

Liman had little time to organize the defences, but he had two things in his favour. First, the Ottoman 5th Army in the Gallipoli peninsula was the best army they had, some 84,000 well-equipped soldiers in six divisions. Second, he was helped by poor Allied leadership. On 25 April 1915, the British landed a major force at Cape Helles. His decision to pull back the strong line of coastal defenses the local Turkish commanders had established and group them inland in preparation for the Allied attack almost gave an early victory to Allies. He was also convinced that Allied landings would take place at Saros Bay and did not believe for a long time the landings at Arıburnu was the main assault, not a ruse. He did not release the main troops in the critical first day of the landings. One of Liman's best decisions during this time was to promote Mustafa Kemal (later known as Atatürk) to command the 19th division. Kemal's division was crucial to the Ottomans' defense. His troops marched up on the day of the landings and occupied the ridge line above the ANZAC landing site, just as the ANZAC troops were moving up the slope themselves. Kemal recognized the danger and personally made sure his troops held the ridge line. They were never forced off despite constant attacks for the next five months.

From April to November 1915 (when the decision to evacuate was made), Liman had to fight off numerous attacks against his defensive positions. The British tried another landing at Suvla Bay, but this also was halted by the Ottoman defenders. The only bright spot for the British in this entire operation was that they managed to evacuate their positions without much loss. However, this battle was a major victory for the Ottoman army and some of the credit is given to the generalship of Liman von Sanders.

Early in 1915, the previous head of the German military mission to the Ottoman Empire, Baron von der Goltz, arrived in Istanbul as military advisor to the (essentially powerless) Sultan, Mehmed V. The old Baron did not get along with Liman von Sanders and did not like the three Pashas (Enver Pasha, Cemal Pasha and Talat) who ran the Ottoman Empire during the war. The Baron proposed some major offensives against the British, but these proposals came to nothing in the face of Allied offensives against the Ottomans on three fronts (the Dardanelles, the Caucasus Front, and the newly opened Mesopotamian Front). Liman was rid of the old Baron when Enver Pasha sent him to fight the British in Mesopotamia in October 1915. (Goltz died there six months later, just before the British army at Kut surrendered.)

Von Sanders was accused of "deliberately" cutting a trench system through the British war cemeteries at Gallipoli and of the maltreatment of British prisoners of war.

=== Sinai and Palestine ===
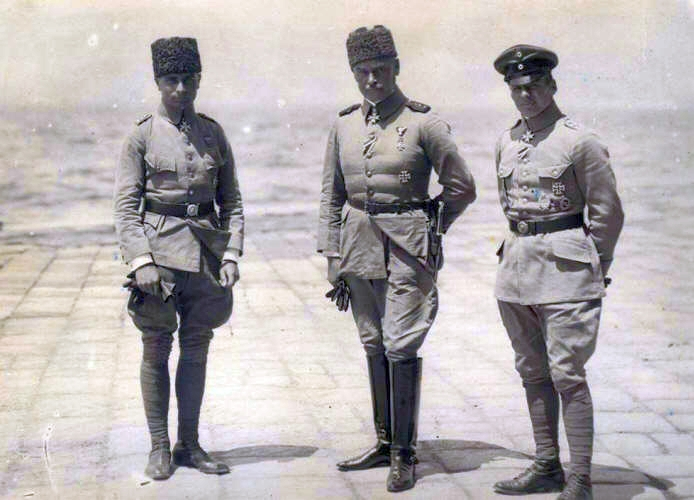
Hans-Joachim Buddecke, Otto Liman von Sanders, and Oswald Boelcke in Ottoman Turkey, 1916

In 1918, the last year of the war, Liman von Sanders took over command of the Ottoman army during the Sinai and Palestine Campaign, replacing the German General Erich von Falkenhayn who had been defeated by British General Allenby at the end of 1917.

Liman was hampered by the significant decline in power of the Ottoman army. His forces were unable to do anything more than occupy defensive positions and wait for the British attack. The attack was a long time in coming, but when General Allenby finally unleashed his army, the entire Ottoman army was destroyed in a week of fighting (see the Battle of Megiddo). In the rout, Liman was nearly taken prisoner by British soldiers.

== Later life ==
After being released, Liman returned home and retired from the German army later that year. After former Ottoman Grand Vizier Talaat Pasha was assassinated by Armenian revolutionary Soghomon Tehlirian in Berlin in March 1921, Liman was called upon to testify as an expert witness at Tehlirian's trial. Tehlirian was ultimately acquitted.

In 1927 he published Fünf Jahre Türkei (tr. Five Years in Turkey), a book he had written in captivity in Malta about his experiences before and during the war.

Liman von Sanders died in Munich on 22 August 1929, at the age of seventy-four.

== Involvement during the Late Ottoman Genocides ==
In April 1917, Liman von Sanders gave the order to "evacuate" the Greeks of Aivali, who numbered around 12,000 to 20,000, due to their "persistent treason and espionage communication" with the Allied Powers. However, he noted that only those individuals "whose hostility could be proven" be evacuated. Surprisingly, this order was criticized by Talaat Pasha who stated that the deportation order was difficult to support after the Aivali Greeks "had pledged to moderation and tolerance". Liman partly withdrew the order in the summer and expressed that its scale was inappropriate.

Nevertheless, against the will of Ottoman officials and with support from the German Foreign Office, Von Sanders saved the Greeks from wholesale deportation in 1916 and, again in late 1917, intervened to save Greek civilians who were about to be deported from Smyrna. Earlier, in 1915, after one group of 300 Armenians were deported from Smyrna, von Sanders blocked additional deportations by threatening to use military force to obstruct them. The German Foreign Office in Berlin again supported the stance of Von Sanders and, as such, the Turks obliged. In June 1917, he refused Enver Pasha's orders to deport Greeks under his jurisdiction. In December 1917, a similar dispute between Von Sanders and Enver Pasha occurred. The former contacted Johann Heinrich von Bernstorff to convince the latter to retract the order. Bernstorff stated that he would speak to Talaat Pasha, who allegedly did not seek the persecution of the Greeks, causing Enver to back down. In his memoirs, Von Sanders stated:

I had protected the Greeks in Smyrna, and in the entire coast region of Asia Minor, in innumerable cases against Turkish encroachments. My picture was hung as acknowledgment in the large Greek school, and the president of the Greek community in Smyrna had offered me a banquet on behalf of the Greeks.

After the end of World War I, Von Sanders attempted to contact the Greek government to stress that he had played no part in the persecution of the Greeks in Anatolia, contrary to "slanderous rumours" told by Turkish generals.

=== Assessment and conspiracy theories ===
Owing to the aforementioned involvement, according to historian Tessa Hofmann, there exist "discrepancies between political or literary myth and historic reality" regarding Von Sander's involvement. In reality, she states, Von Sanders saved the Armenians and the Greeks from suffering even further deportations and massacres in the hands of the Turks.

In addition, some far-right groups today have accused Von Sanders of being a perpetrator of the Armenian genocide and the Greek genocide, oftentimes mentioning his Jewish descent. For example, the neo-Nazi organization Golden Dawn claimed in 1996 that Von Sanders was "a demonic crypto-Jew" who personally orchestrated both genocides. This view is considered by political scientist Neil Bar as being an "elaborate historical fabrication".

== Criticism of Turkish command ==
Von Sanders criticized the Committee of Union and Progress (CUP), lacking confidence in them and being extremely frustrated with "the inefficiency of Turkish civil and military administration". He sought to be recalled from the "Turkish backwater" before the Ottoman Empire entered the war, but failed. He also criticized Mustafa Kemal Atatürk, his anti-German sentiments and his strategies, despite viewing him as a first-class soldier. For example, he viewed the latter as "overly proud" and deemed his strategy, which aimed to keep forces near the coast to stop the enemy before landing, as risky and preferred to keep troops inland instead.

Von Sanders also believed that Mustafa Kemal falsely attributed the accomplishments of the victory in the Gallipoli campaign to himself, without crediting anyone else, despite the fact that "only the Germans" were ruling the command chain and deploying and directing all the artillery units during the campaign.

== See also ==
- Hans Freiherr von Wangenheim (1859–1915), diplomat for Imperial Germany accused of complicity in the Armenian genocide
- Bund der Asienkämpfer (1918–1938), social welfare organisation for German World War I veterans who had served in the Near East and the Balkans
- Erich Prigge (1878–1955), adjutant to Marshal von Sanders (1914–19) and military memoirist

Military offices
Preceded by Erich von Falkenhayn	Commander of Yildirim Army Group; 1918	Succeeded by Mustafa Kemal
