= Wedel family =

German noble family

House of Wedel
- Nobility
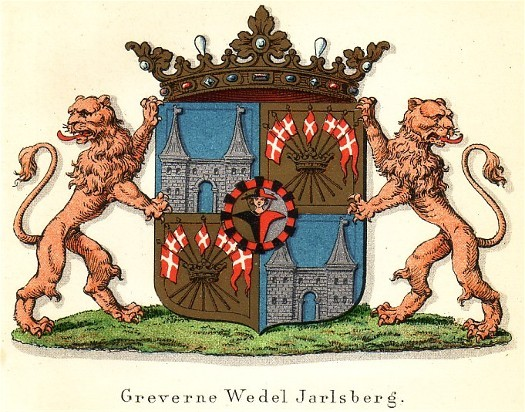
- Coat of arms of Counts of Wedel-Jarlsberg
- Country: Holy Roman Empire; Denmark; Norway
- Place of origin: Stormarn
- Founder: Heinrich of Novum Monasterium
- Historic seat: Skaugum (Norwegian branch)
- Titles: Prince; Count; *Count of Wedel-Jarlsberg; Baron; Vogt

The House of Wedel (or Wedell) is an old and distinguished German noble family, from Stormarn in what is now Schleswig-Holstein. The family members held the title of Prince, Count and Baron.

== History ==
The family is first mentioned in records through Heinricus, Hasso and Reimbernus de Wedele in 1212, and traces its familial line to the monastery vogt Heinrich, of the monastery "Novum Monasterium“, who is mentioned on 13 September 1149 in Ottenbüttel (Steinburg, Schleswig-Holstein). In December 1302 the brothers Heinrich, Johannes and Reinbert recorded that their uncle Reinhard the Elder was selling the village of Spitzerdorf to the Hamburg cathedral chapter in their presence and with their consent. Three brothers from the family appear in 1212 as witnesses in a record by Heinrich von Barmstede. A member of the family was captured after the second battle of Uetersen in 1306, broken on the wheel and quartered. The family exists in three branches. In 1328 Emperor Louis IV granted the lords of Wedel the towns or castles of Küstrin, Falkenburg, Schievelbein, Neu-Wedel, Kallies, Reetz, Nörenberg, Hochzeit, Klein-Mellen and Berneuchen as fiefs. From 1444 to 1445, Hans von Wedel was a diplomatic negotiator between the Teutonic Knights and the Kingdom of Poland.

A branch of the family was settled from the early 18th century in East Frisia. They owned the manor of Loga, now a part of the city of Leer. Here they built the Evenburg and the Philippsburg. In 1746, the family acquired Schloss Gödens through marriage. This comital line (Gödens-Evenburg) had a hereditary seat in the Prussian House of Lords from 5 December 1867 until the 1918 Revolution. No fewer than 77 member of Wedel family joined the NSDAP, the largest among any German noble family. The family is not related to the Warsaw business family Wedel.

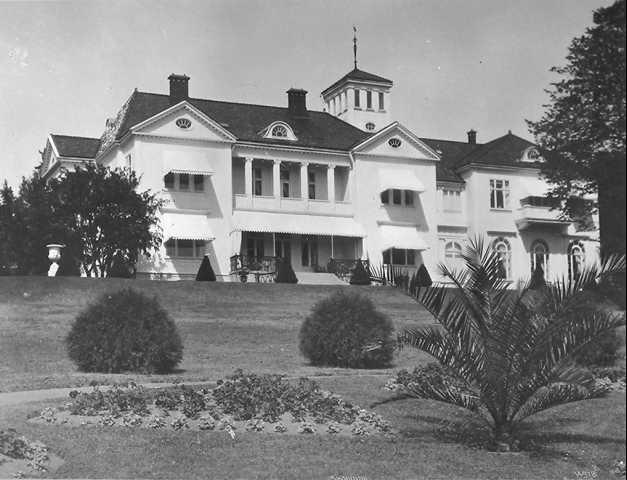
The original Skaugum, built in 1891 for Fritz Wedel Jarlsberg

== Notable members ==
- Adam Ditlev Wedell-Wedellsborg (1782-1827), Dano-Norwegian government official
- Albert von Wedel (1793–1866), Prussian district administrator of Angermünde
- Botho von Wedel (1862–1943), German diplomat
- Busso von Wedell (1804–1874), Prussian treasury official and district president
- Busso von Wedel (1897–1981), German colonel and recipient of the Knight's Cross of the Iron Cross on 18 May 1943, recipient of the German Cross in gold on 25 March 1942
- Carl Georg Friedrich Gerhard von Wedel (1827–1898), hereditary member of the Prussian House of Lords
- Carl Heinrich von Wedel (1712–1782), Prussian Lieutenant General and minister of war, recipient of the Pour le Mérite
- Charlotte Wedell (1862–1953), Danish baroness and mathematician
- Erhard von Wedel (1861–1931), hereditary member of the Prussian House of Lords
- Erich Rüdiger von Wedel (1892–1954), German fighter pilot in World War I
- Ernst von Wedel (1844–1910), landowner and member of the Prussian House of Lords
- Ernst Sigismund von Wedell (1704–1758), Prussian Major and commander of a grenadier battalion
- Friedrich von Wedell-Malchow (1823–1890), jurist and member of the Reichstag
- Georg von Wedell (1820–1894), Prussian Lieutenant General, recipient of the Pour le Mérite on 20 September 1866
- Georg Clemens August von Wedel, president of the East Frisian Estates-General (1779–1788)
- Gustav Wilhelm von Wedel (1641–1717), Danish general in Norway, from 1684 Danish count of Jarlsberg (see also: Wedel-Jarlsberg)
- Hans von Wedel (14th century), Hofmeister to the Margrave of Brandenburg and co-owner of Fortress Oderberg
- Hans Otto von Wedel (1861–1929), Prussian Major General
- Hasso von Wedel (1898–1961), German Major General
- Hasso von Wedel (1893–1945), colonel of the Luftwaffe
- Hasso Otto von Wedel (1863–1940), German Major General
- Hasso Sebastian Georg von Wedel (1859–1935), Prussian Lieutenant General
- Hedda von Wedel (born 1942), German jurist and politician
- Heinrich Kaspar von Wedel (1778–1858), Prussian officer und recipient of the Pour le Mérite
- Hermann Alexander Wilhelm von Wedel (1813–1894), Prussian Lieutenant General
- Hermann von Wedel (1893–1944), Major General and commander of the 10th Field Division (L), recipient of the Knight's Cross of the Iron Cross on 8 June 1943, recipient of the German Cross in gold on 18 October 1941
- Hermann Georg von Wedel (1848–1913), Prussian Lieutenant General
- Joachim von Wedel (1552–1609), German landowner and annalist
- Johann von Wedell (1679–1742), Prussian Major General
- Karl von Wedel (1783–1858), Prussian Lieutenant General
- Karl Fürst von Wedel (1842–1919), Prussian General and diplomat
- Karl von Wedel (1845–1917), district administrator, member of the Prussian House of Lords
- Karl von Wedel-Parlow (1873–1936), landowner and member of the Reichstag
- Kurt von Wedel (1846–1927), landowner und member of the Prussian House of Lords
- Lupold von Wedel (1544–1612/1615), German travel writer, war reporter and mercenary leader
- Otto von Wedel (1769–1813), Prussian officer und recipient of the Pour le Mérite
- Wilhelm von Wedel (1798–1872), Lieutenant General
- Wilhelm von Wedell-Piesdorf (1837–1915), Prussian minister of the royal household and member of the Prussian House of Lords
- Wilhelm von Wedel (1891−1939), German police official and SS-Brigadeführer
- Wilhelm von Wedell (1801–1866), Prussian administrative lawyer

== See also ==
- Wedel-Jarlsberg
- Veydelevka, formerly a Ukrainian manor of the Wedel family.
