= Bund der Asienkämpfer =

The Bund der Asienkämpfer (BdAK), more rarely mentioned as Bund Deutscher Asienkämpfer (BDAK), meaning "League of Asian Warriors" or "League of German Asian Warriors", was a social welfare organization for German veterans who had been in the Asia Corps, the units of the German Empire at the service of the Ottoman Empire in the Near East and the Balkans during World War I.

== History ==
The BdAK was established in 1918, at the end of the war, by German ex-armymen. One of their main purposes was to investigate what had happened to entire missing German units of the Asia Corps, including German nurses (German Red Cross Sisters), when the Palestine-Transjordan front collapsed at the end of September 1918. At that time many Germans fighting along Turkish troops in the Sinai and Palestine Campaign suddenly found themselves behind enemy lines, fighting for their lives.

== Publications ==
This association issued a magazine, the "Orient Rundschau," during its heyday, which was during the 1920s, until well into the Nazi time. In the name of Gleichschaltung, the Bund der Asienkämpfer was affiliated to the NSDAP after the Nazi takeover of power in 1933. It was finally disbanded by the Nazi authorities in 1938.

== See also ==
- Otto Liman von Sanders
- Colmar Freiherr von der Goltz
- Erich Prigge
- Gallipoli Star (Ottoman Empire)
- Sinai and Palestine Campaign
- Franz Carl Endres

== Notes and references ==
(partly)

- & Pictures of German troops at the Asian front
- History: BdAK Magazine
- DRK Nurses
