= Zabern Affair =

Political scandal in Germany 1913

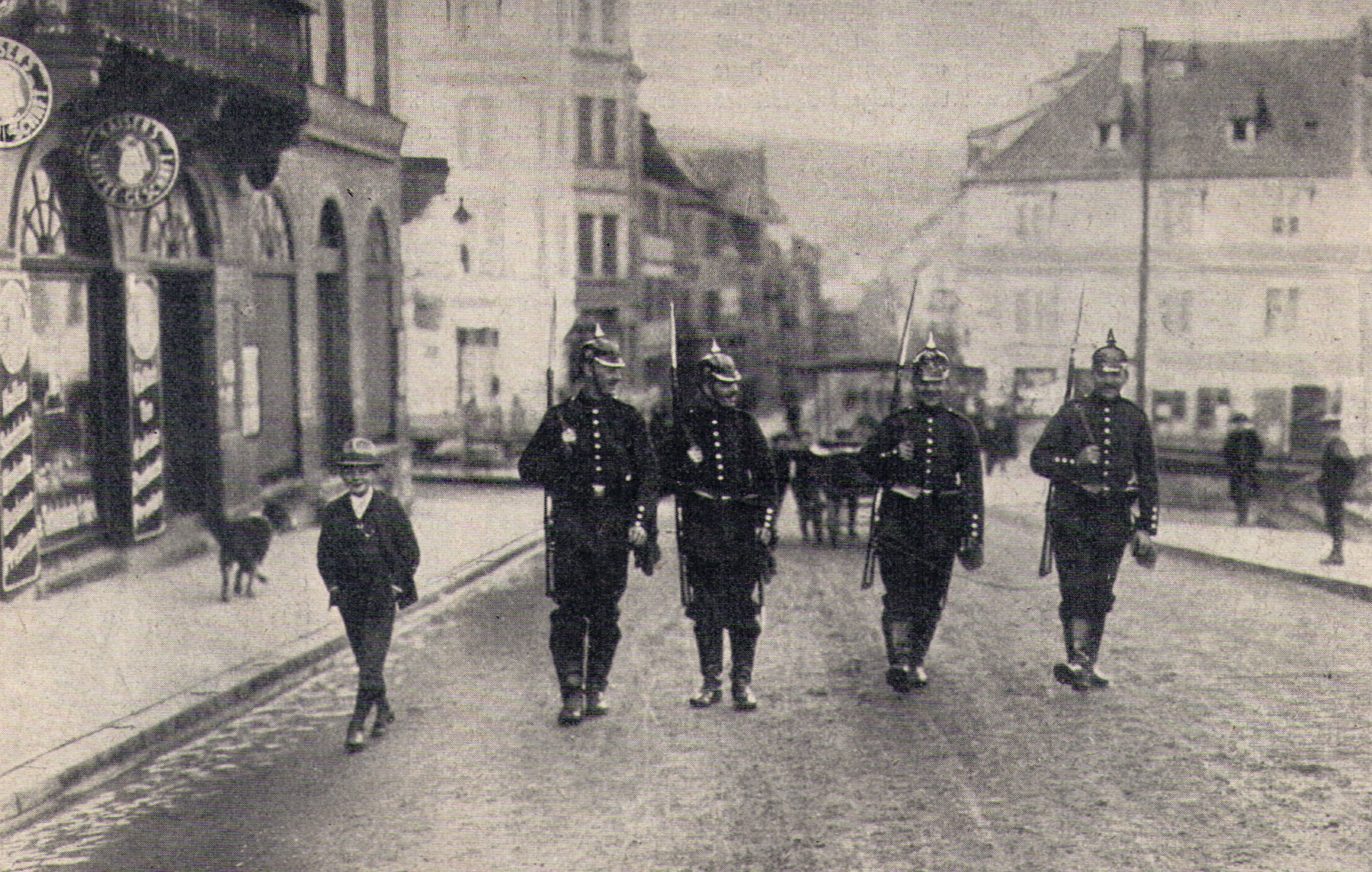
Prussian soldiers patrolling in the streets of Zabern.

The Zabern or Saverne Affair (German: Zabern-Affäre) was a crisis of domestic policy which occurred in the German Empire at the end of 1913. It was caused by political unrest in Zabern (now Saverne) in Alsace-Lorraine, where two battalions of the Prussian 99th (2nd Upper Rhenish) Infantry Regiment were garrisoned, after a second-lieutenant insulted the Alsatian population. The military reacted to the protests with arbitrary illegal acts. These infringements led to a debate in the German Reichstag about the militaristic structures of German society, as well as the position of the leadership of the Empire in relationship to Kaiser Wilhelm II. The affair not only put a severe strain on the relationship between the imperial state of Alsace-Lorraine and the remainder of the German Empire, but also led to a considerable loss of prestige of the Kaiser.

== Causes ==
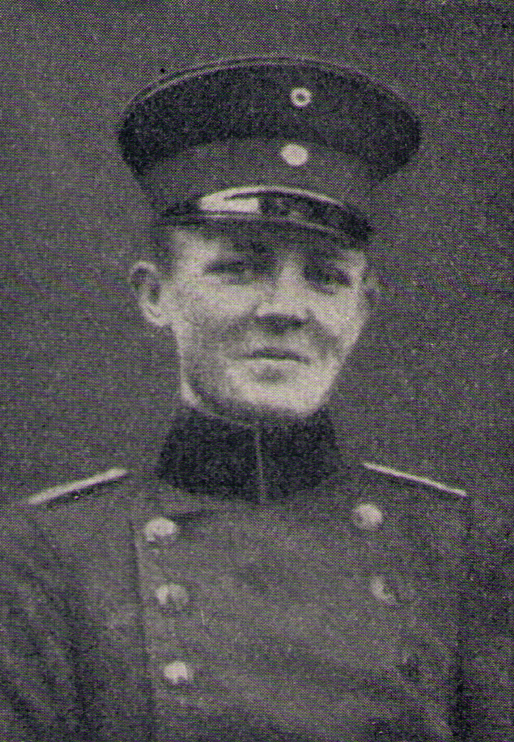
Leutnant von Forstner in 1913

=== Forstner insults the Alsatians ===
The twenty-year-old Second Lieutenant Günter Freiherr von Forstner (1893–1915) spoke disparagingly about the inhabitants of Zabern on October 28 during a troop induction. He said to his soldiers, "If you are attacked, then make use of your weapon; if you stab such a Wackes in the process, then you'll get ten marks from me." (Wackes is a German derogatory term for a native Alsatian and was considered inflammatory enough that German military regulations prohibited its use.)

In addition, he warned his men with seemingly aggressive language against French agents, who wanted to recruit them for the Foreign Legion.

=== Public indignation and an unyielding military ===
On November 6, the two local newspapers, the Elsässer and the Zaberner Anzeiger, informed the public about these events. The population protested strongly against this treatment by the Prussian military in the next few days. The Statthalter (governor) of Alsace-Lorraine, Count Karl von Wedel, urged the commander of the regiment, Adolf von Reuter, as well as the commanding general, Berthold von Deimling to transfer the second lieutenant. From the viewpoint of the military, however, this was not consistent with the honor and the prestige of the German Imperial Army. Lieutenant von Forstner was sentenced to merely six days of house arrest (and the public was not informed of even this token punishment, which gave the impression that Forstner had gone completely unpunished). The official statement of the authorities in Strasbourg on November 11 played down the incident, and interpreted "Wackes" as a general description for quarrelsome people. Eleven days later, ten members of the Fifth Company of Infantry Regiment 99 were arrested and accused of reporting secrets about the Saverne affair to the press.

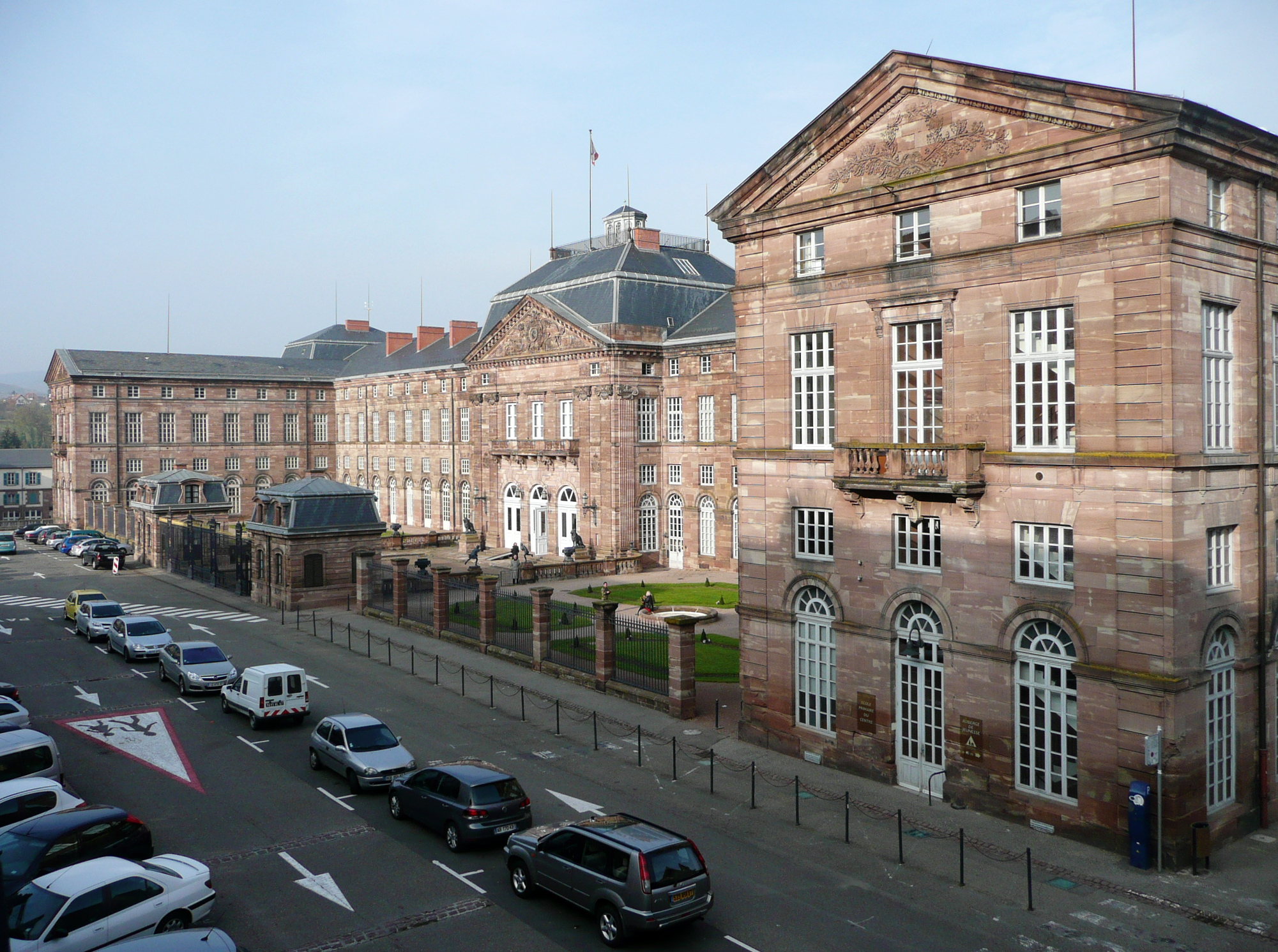
The Rohan Castle in Zabern was used as barracks for the 99th Prussian infantry regiment

Unimpressed by these actions, the Alsatian public continued to protest. As a further provocation, Lieutenant Forstner showed himself to the public again after his house arrest, accompanied by an escort of four armed soldiers, by order of the garrison command. Lieutenant Forstner was repeatedly derided and abused, above all by youthful demonstrators, during his appearances outside the barracks, without the local police authorities being able to prevent it. Colonel von Reuter asked the leader of the local civil administration, Director Mahl, to restore order with the aid of the police, or else he would have to take measures himself. As an Alsatian, Mahl sympathized with the population and denied the request, since the protesters were behaving peacefully and had committed no violations of the law.

=== The situation escalates ===
On November 28, a huge crowd of people again assembled before the barracks, which led to a counter-reaction of the troops. Von Reuter instructed Second Lieutenant Schadt, who had command of the sentries at that time, to disperse the crowd. Schadt called the sentries to arms and ordered the crowd three times to disperse. The soldiers drove the crowd across the courtyard of the barracks into a side street, under threat of force of arms, and arrested a great number of people without any legal basis. Among the prisoners were the president, two judges and a prosecuting attorney of the Saverne court, who had accidentally become mixed up in the crowd when leaving the court building. Twenty-six of the arrested people were locked up in a coal cellar overnight. The editorial rooms of one of the local newspapers which had publicized Forstner's transgressions were also illegally searched by soldiers after hints from an informant. A feeling as of as being under siege hung over the city, and machine guns were displayed in the streets.

== Course of events ==
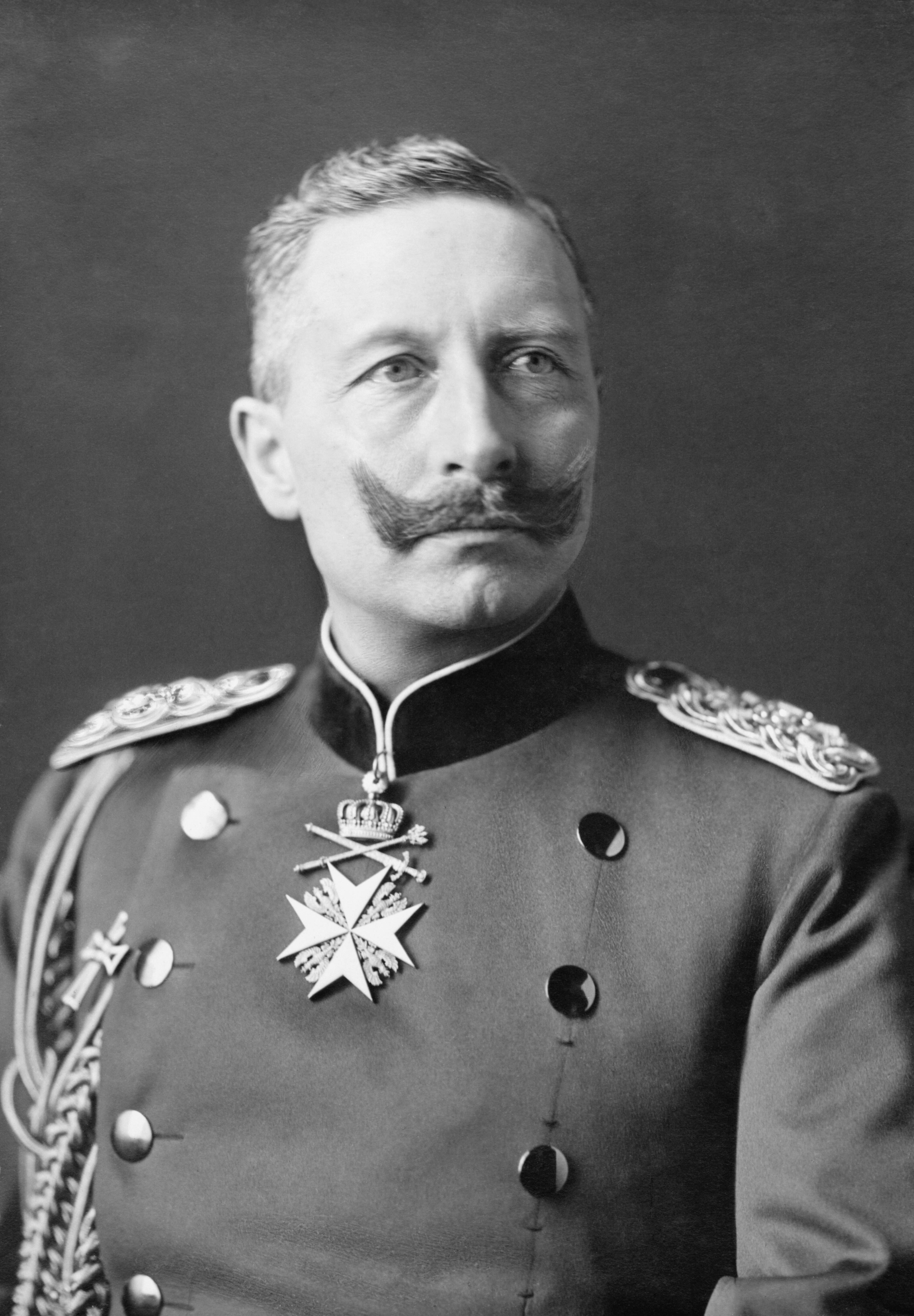
Kaiser Wilhelm II

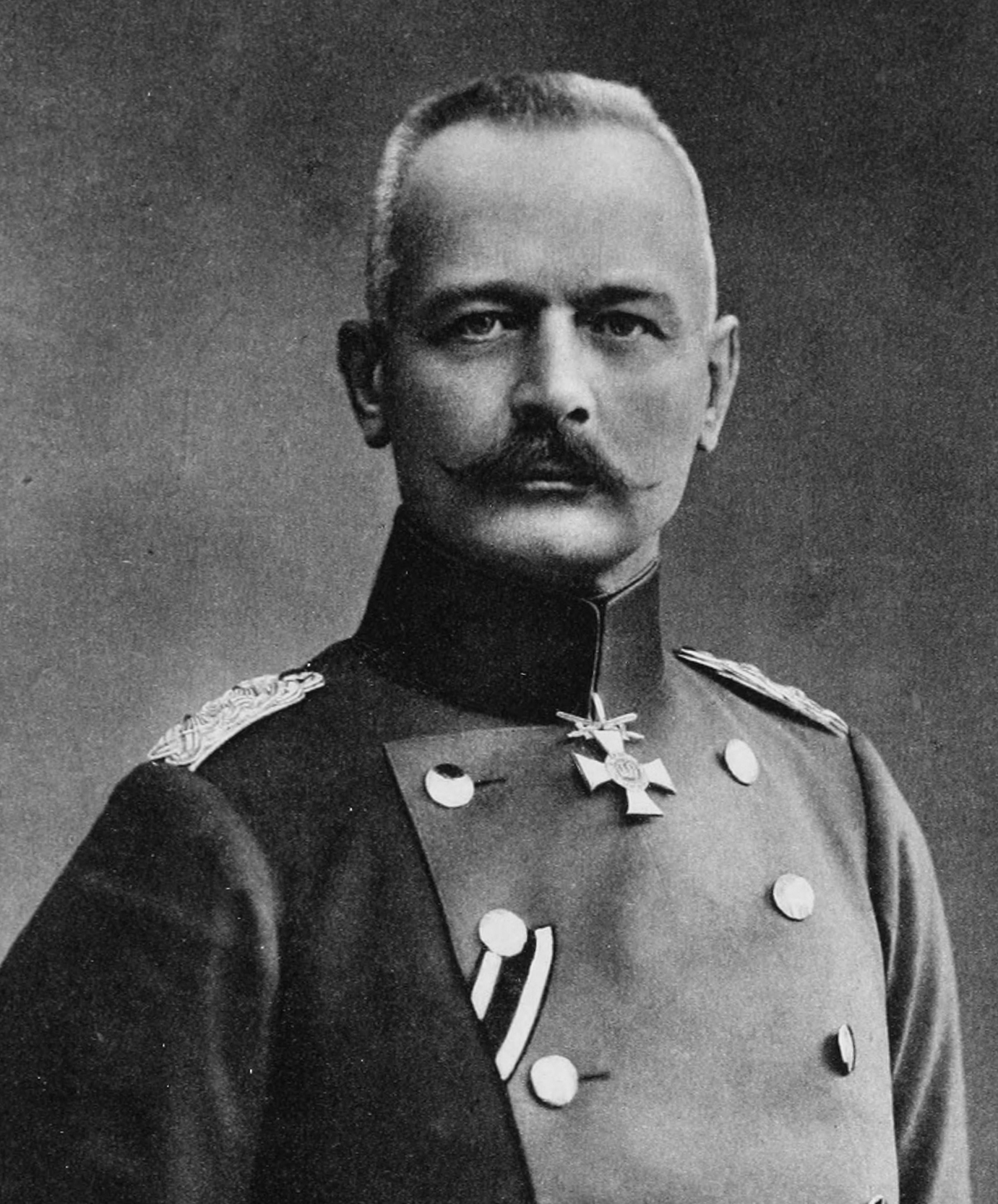
Erich von Falkenhayn

=== The first reactions of the Kaiser ===
Emperor Wilhelm II was hunting on the estate of Max Egon Fürst zu Fürstenberg in Donaueschingen at the time. Although this trip had been organized long before the events in Saverne, Wilhelm's lack of interest left a bad impression. According to rumors, the Empress, Augusta Victoria of Schleswig-Holstein, had even ordered a train to take her to her husband so she could persuade him to return to Berlin. According to the historian Wolfgang Mommsen, Wilhelm II underestimated the political dimension of the incident in Alsace at this point in time. The reports which the Statthalter (governor) of Alsace-Lorraine, Karl von Wedel, sent to Donaueschingen, in which he described the incidents as excessive as well as unlawful, were answered so as to play for time. Wilhelm II wanted to wait for the report from the military headquarters in Strasbourg first.

On November 30, the Prussian War Minister, Erich von Falkenhayn, General Berthold Deimling and some other high-ranking officers arrived in Donaueschingen and six days of discussions began. The public became even angrier because of that, since the Kaiser apparently only wanted to hear the viewpoint of the military. Chancellor Theobald von Bethmann Hollweg, who had been passed over and who came more and more under pressure, joined the conference shortly before it ended. The result was disillusionment in the view of the critical classes of the population; the Kaiser approved of the behavior of the military officers and saw no reason to believe that they had exceeded their authority. Deimling sent a brigade general to Saverne, who restored civilian authority on December 1.

=== Forstner's second false step ===
On December 2, a military exercise was held in Saverne. The scene was watched from the street by Karl Blank, a journeyman shoemaker, who burst into laughter at the sight of the young, finely dressed Forstner, and some locals that were standing around joined in. Enraged, Forstner struck down Blank with his saber, causing severe head injuries. This new act of aggression further intensified the affair.

Forstner was sentenced to 43 days of arrest by a military court in the first trial, and in the appellate trial, the verdict was reversed completely. Although he had been accompanied by five armed soldiers and Blank was unarmed, as well as paralyzed on one side, the judge interpreted his actions as self-defense, since the shoemaker had been guilty of insulting the crown. Within military circles, Forstner received encouragement, since he had defended the honor of the army with his act of violence.

=== Censure vote against Bethmann Hollweg ===
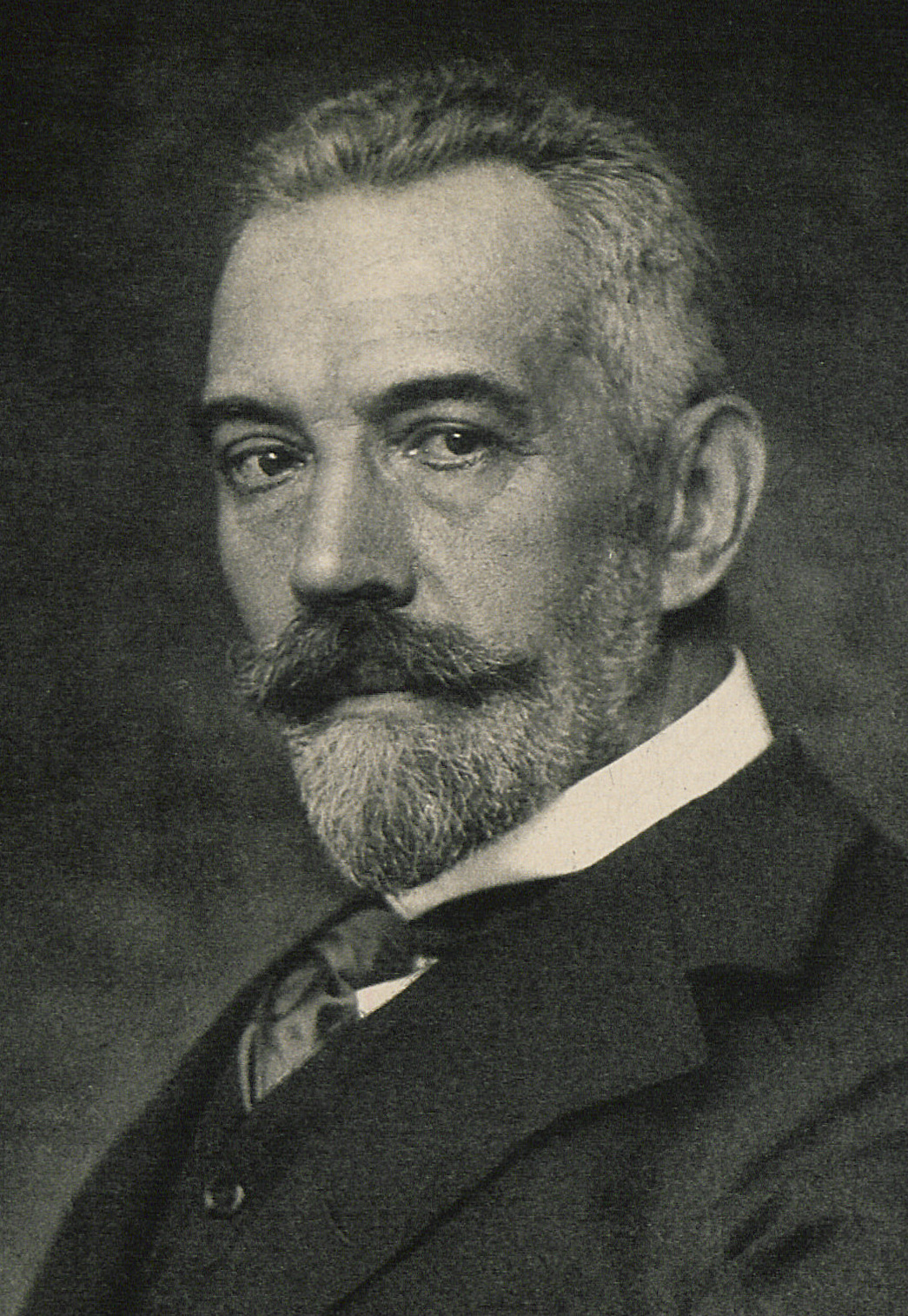
Theobald von Bethmann Hollweg

The events in Saverne also caused heated debate in the Reichstag. The Centre Party, the Social Democratic Party (SPD) and Progressive People's Party directed parliamentary inquiries to the Chancellor. Three representatives, Karl Hauss from the Centre Party, Adolf Röser from the Progressive People's Party and Jacques Peirotes from the SPD, opened the discussion on December 3 by explaining their critical views of the Saverne affair as representatives of their respective parties. Bethmann Hollweg played down the behavior of the military in his concluding speech. According to observers of the proceedings, he seemed visibly nervous and shaken. After him, Falkenhayn spoke before the Reichstag for the first time. He defended the officers, who had only done their duty, and sharply attacked the press, who had played up the affair with propagandistic methods to bring their influence to bear on the military.

At this time, it became clear how different the views of the Reichstag and the Chancellor were. The debate was continued on the next day. Bethmann Hollweg commented again on the events. His second speech did make a better impression, but it could no longer turn the mood of the Reichstag around. On December 4, the parliament made use of a censure vote (§ 33a of the standing orders of the Reichstag, a section which had been at its disposal since 1912) for the first time in the history of the Empire. With 293 votes, four abstentions and 54 opposing votes, which came exclusively from the ranks of the conservatives, it disapproved the behavior of the government as being "not the view of the Reichstag".

However, the vote had no effect at all, which is why the Saverne affair serves as an example of the balance of power in the German Empire of the early 20th century. When the SPD demanded that Bethmann Hollweg face the consequences of the disapproval and resign, he refused and indicated that he was only dependent upon the confidence of the Kaiser. That was how it was foreseen in article 15 of the Constitution. According to that, the Kaiser alone could replace the Chancellor. But he did not want to follow the decision of the Reichstag, since he wanted to resist the "parliamentarizing" of the Empire with all his might. In addition, Bethmann Hollweg denied that the question of the parliament had a binding effect on the government. The Reichstag and the political parties were considered to be of merely secondary importance in the Empire.

An attempt by the SPD, on December 9, to reject the chancellor's proposed budget, thus forcing him out of office, did not find sufficient approval. Only the Polish Party (Polenpartei) supported the suggestion of the Social Democrats.

=== Protests in the entire German Reich ===
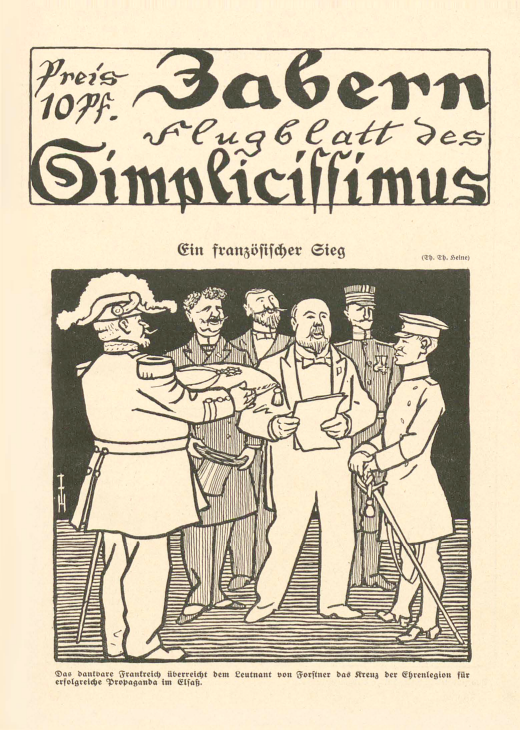
A cartoon portraying French officials giving the Légion d'honneur distinction to von Forstner for "successful propaganda in Alsace".

On November 28, the district councillor of Saverne wrote a telegram to Kaiser Wilhelm II, Bethmann Hollweg and Falkenhayn, in which he protested against the arbitrary arrests of his citizens. Two days later, an assembly of the SPD with 3000 participants took place in Mülhausen, which demonstrated against the infringements of the soldiers. In a resolution, the participants described the state as a military dictatorship and demanded resistance against the prevailing conditions—if necessary even by means of strikes.

In Strasbourg, the mayors of several cities of Alsace-Lorraine appealed to the Kaiser on December 2 to take measures to guarantee the protection of their residents against military despotism.

A wave of indignation spread throughout the empire. Many were horrified about the way the military was handling things, not least in the SPD. On December 3, the SPD party chairman called upon all organizations of the party to assemblies of protest.

Four days later, rallies took place in 17 German cities—Berlin, Breslau, Chemnitz, Duisburg, Düsseldorf, Elberfeld, Cologne, Leipzig, Mülheim an der Ruhr, Munich, Solingen and Strasbourg, among others—at which social democrats demonstrated against the despotic rule of the military and demanded the resignations of Bethmann Hollweg and Falkenhayn. A people's movement ignited against militarism and for the defense of the rights of the national minorities in the German Reich.

However, the government of the Kaiser did not relent. To avoid further problems for the time being, the Kaiser ordered a temporary move of the Saverne units from Donaueschingen on December 5. In the next two days, the soldiers moved to the troop training grounds in Oberhofen (near Haguenau) and Bitche.

Further rebellions were suppressed. On December 11, the military court in Strasbourg sentenced two recruits from Saverne to three and six weeks of military arrest respectively because they had publicly confirmed Forstner's insulting statements.

At the request of the general command of the XV army corps there, the Strasbourg police confiscated a recording made by the gramophone company Cromer and Schrack on December 17. The recording revealed the events of the Saverne affair through dialogues with a background of drum rolls. In addition, the military instituted legal proceedings because of the insult to German officers. The protests then waned.

== Consequences ==
=== The trial against von Reuter and Schadt ===
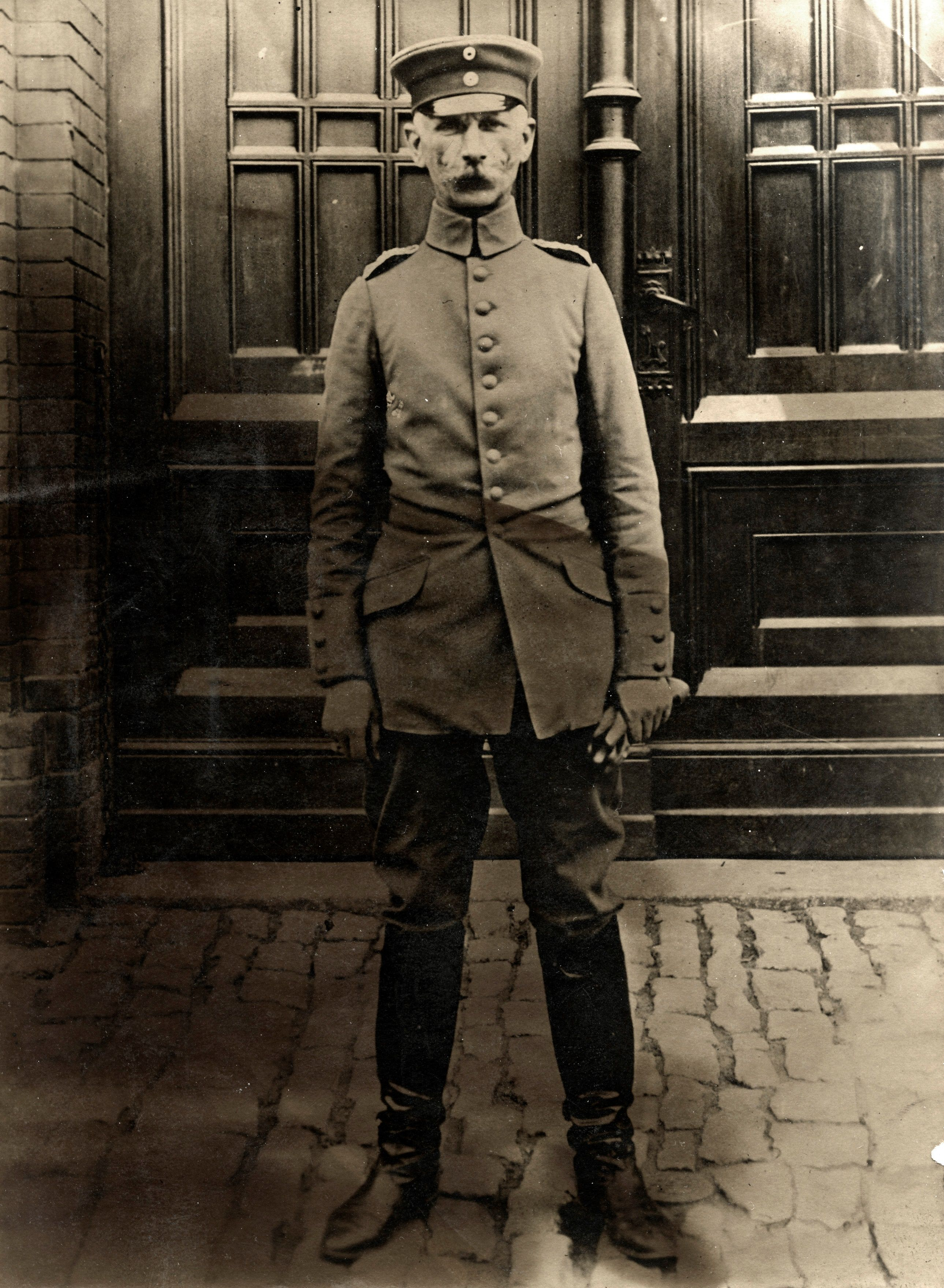
Colonel von Reuter

The trial before the military court in Strasbourg from January 5 through January 10 acquitted both of the men chiefly responsible, Colonel von Reuter and Second Lieutenant Schadt, from charges of unlawfully appropriating authority from the civilian police. The court admittedly apologized for the infringements of the soldiers, but lay the blame on the civil authorities whose task it should have been to maintain order. It referred to an order of the Prussian cabinet from 1820. According to the order, the highest-ranking military official of a city must seize legal authority if the civil authority neglects to maintain order. Because the defendants had acted on the strength of these regulations, they could not be convicted.

While many liberal citizens who had followed the trial with interest were now bitterly disappointed, great jubilation about the decision spread among the military personnel present. They congratulated the defendants, while still in the court room. Wilhelm II also was visibly pleased and even conferred a medal on von Reuter by return mail. The military left the stage as a strong and self-confident victor, and even had its inviolability in the Empire confirmed.

=== Legal regulation of military deployment within Germany ===
On January 14, the Reichstag decided to form a committee to legally regulate the rights of the military with regard to the civilian authority. Two motions of the National Liberal Party chairman Ernst Bassermann and the Centre politician Martin Spahn, which demanded clarification from the imperial government regarding the civilian law authority of military instances, were approved by the Reichstag ten days later.

The result, the "Regulation about use of weapons by the military and its participation in suppression of domestic unrest", was issued by the Kaiser on March 19. It forbade the Prussian army from intervening without authorization in areas of civilian responsibility. Instead, the civilian authorities had to request deployment of troops ahead of time. The law remained in existence up until January 17, 1936, when the Nazis abolished it with the "Ordinance about the use of weapons by the Wehrmacht".

=== Revival of the Reichstag debate ===
The criminal justice theoretician, Franz von Liszt, kindled a new debate in the Reichstag when he disputed the validity of the cabinet order from 1820. On January 23, Bethmann Hollweg confirmed the validity of the order, however, and legitimized the military actions in Saverne by doing so.

=== Consequences for Alsace-Lorraine ===
The relationship between Alsace-Lorraine and the rest of the German Empire was noticeably affected for the worse. The Alsatians and Lorrainers felt themselves more helplessly at the mercy of the arbitrariness of the German military than ever. The second chamber of the Alsace-Lorraine parliament commented on the incidents on January 14 in a resolution. While they defended the conduct of the civilian authorities, they condemned the action of the military, as well as the acquittal of Commander von Reuter. Landtag representatives of various parties founded the League for the Defense of Alsace-Lorraine in Strasbourg on February 26. In addition, the parliament issued a decree on June 16, according to which all persons conscripted in the future could only perform their service outside of the German state (that is, Alsace-Lorraine).

Through the Saverne affair, there were also changes in personnel, as a result of which the two most important positions in Alsace-Lorraine were newly filled. On January 31, the State Secretary in the Ministry for Alsace-Lorraine, Hugo Zorn von Bulach, was replaced by the Potsdam Upper Presidial Councillor, Siegfried von Roedern. The Reichsstatthalter, Karl von Wedel, resigned on April 18, whereupon the Kaiser put the Prussian Minister of the Interior, Johann von Dallwitz in this office, to the disappointment of the Alsatians. Dallwitz was a determined advocate of the authoritarian state and also rejected the constitution which had been granted to Alsace-Lorraine in 1911.

However, the First World War prevented further serious conflicts between the German Empire and Alsace-Lorraine. Lt Forstner would be killed in combat in 1915 at Kobryn on the Eastern Front.

=== Assimilation into literature and language ===
The author Heinrich Mann assimilated the Saverne affair in his novel, Der Untertan, which has been translated into English under the titles "Man of Straw," "The Patrioteer," and "The Loyal Subject".

The author Ulrich Rauscher mocked the "well-behaved citizen":

Ob Euresgleichen auch zu Haufen
vor Bajonett und Säbelhieb –
Marsch, Marsch! Hopp, Hopp! – Spießruten laufen:
Ihr seid doch alle leutnantslieb!
Ihr fühlt nur unter Kolbenstößen
Euch wahrhaft wohl im Vaterland.
Verdammt, die sich derart entblößen,
nachdem sie selber sich entmannt!
Euch werde fernerhin in Gnaden
der Säbel übers Hirn gehaut!
Ihr seid des Deutschen Reichs Kastraten!
Hurrah, du Eisenbraut!

A very rough translation:

Even though heaps of your kind,
away from bayonets and sabre strokes –
March, march! Hupp, hupp! – run the gauntlet:
You are all fond of the lieutenant!
Only under the blows of a club
do you really feel at home in the fatherland.
Damned, those who expose themselves like that,
after they have unmanned themselves!
Further, you will mercifully be hit
by the sabre on the brain!
You are the eunuchs of the German Empire!
Hurrah, you iron bride!

Kurt Tucholsky made fun of the "courage" of Second Lieutenant Forstner in a poem for Vorwärts:

Der Held von Zabern

Ein «Mann» mit einem langen Messer,
und zwanzig Jahr –
ein Held, ein Heros und Schokladenesser,
und noch kein einzig Schnurrbarthaar.
Das stelzt in Zaberns langen Gassen
und kräht Sopran –
Wird man das Kind noch lange ohne Aufsicht lassen? –
Es ist die allerhöchste Eisenbahn! –
Das ist so einer, wie wir viele brauchen! –
Er führt das Korps!
Und tief bewegt sieht man die Seinen tauchen
nach Feinden tief in jedes Abtrittsrohr.
Denn schließlich macht man dabei seine Beute –
wer wagt, gewinnt!
Ein lahmer Schuster ist es heute,
und morgen ist’s ein Waisenkind.
Kurz: er hat Mut, Kuhrasche oder besser:
ein ganzer Mann! –
Denn wehrt sich jemand, sticht er gleich mit’s Messer,
schon, weil der and’re sich nicht wehren kann.

A very rough translation:

The Hero of Saverne

A "man" with a long knife,
and 20 years old -
A hero and a chocolate-eater,
and still not a single hair in his mustache.
He stalks in Saverne's long alleys
and crows in soprano -
How long will the child be left alone without supervision? -
The matter has become of utmost urgency! -
That is the kind that we need so many of! -
He leads the corps!
And deeply moved, his people are seen to dive
for enemies, deep in every privy.
Since in the end, prey is made that way -
nothing ventured, nothing gained!
Today, it is a lame cobbler,
and tomorrow, it's an orphan child.
In short: he has courage, the swiftness of a cow, or better:
a whole man! -
Since if someone puts up a fight, he immediately stabs him with the knife,
because the other cannot protect himself.

Following the conduct of the military, the term zabernism found its way into the English language of the time as a description for the abuse of military authority or for tyrannical, aggressive conduct in general.

H. G. Wells referred to the incident in his novel Mr. Britling Sees It Through, published in 1916. In a letter from the main character, Mr Britling, to an elderly couple in Germany, he states: "At last there was no choice before any European nation but submission to the German will, or war. And it was no will to which righteous men could possibly submit. It came as an illiberal and ungracious will. It was the will of Zabern. It is not as if you had set yourselves to be an imperial people and embrace and unify the world."

== Contemporary quotations ==
- "Have at them!" (German: "Immer feste druff!") (Wilhelm von Hohenzollern, the eldest son of the Kaiser, in a telegram at the end of the year)
- "Do we live in a South American republic, where any colonel can dictate the law to the court authorities, and do life and freedom of the citizen depend upon the decisions of an officer's canteen society for us?" (Theodor Wolff, publicist and author)
- "As no one has reportedly—to speak with Bismarck—imitated the Prussian lieutenant, in fact, still no one has been able to entirely imitate the Prussian-German militarism, that has not only become a state within a state, but virtually a state over the state (...)" (Karl Liebknecht, already seven years before the Saverne Affair)
- "And is not murder and mutilation in war the actual profession and the true nature of those 'military offices', whose wounded authority showed their teeth in Saverne?" (Rosa Luxemburg)
