= Botho von Wedel =

German diplomat (1862–1943)

Botho Graf von Wedel (23 December 1862 – 5 February 1943) was a German nobleman and a diplomat who served as the German ambassador to the Austro-Hungarian Empire.

== Life ==
He was born as a younger son of Count Carl Georg Friedrich von Wedel-Jarlsberg (1827-1898) and his wife, Baroness Frieda Julie Adolphine Gabriele von Wangenheim (1838-1881).

After studying law, he became a law clerk in 1885 and at the same time performed his military service in the German Army. After he left as a Lieutenant, he entered the diplomatic service and was initially posted to the embassy in France. In 1889, he was appointed an attaché in the Foreign Office and in 1890 was made a Legation Secretary. He worked until 1896 as Third Secretary at the embassy in France. Later, he was posted as embassy secretary to the embassy in Spain and then, from 1898 to 1899, as First Secretary in Japan. In 1899, he returned to the Foreign Office and in 1901, he was appointed a Councillor at the embassy in Austria.

In 1904, he was appointed Consul-General in Budapest, and from 1907 to 1909, he was the ambassador to the Grand Duchy of Saxe-Weimar-Eisenach in Weimar. Then, he returned to the Foreign Office.

In late 1916, he was appointed ambassador to Austria-Hungary and succeeded Heinrich von Tschirschky. In 1919 he retired and was succeeded as ambassador in Vienna by William, Prince of Stolberg-Wernigerode.

As the owner of the Philippsburg in Leer, he had the building greatly enlarged in 1906.
