= List of Imperial German uhlan regiments =

List of Imperial German Uhlan Regiments

== German Uhlan Regiments ==
#	State	Regiment	Formed
1		Garde-Ulanen-Regiment Nr.1	Potsdam
2		Garde-Ulanen-Regiment Nr.2	Berlin
3		Garde-Ulanen-Regiment Nr.3	Potsdam
1	West Prussia	Ulanen-Regiment Kaiser Alexander III von Rußland Nr.1	Militsch, Ostrowo
2		Ulanen-Regiment von Katzler Nr.2	Gleiwitz, Pleß
3		Ulanen-Regiment Kaiser Alexander II von Rußland Nr.3	Fürstenwalde
4		Ulanen-Regiment von Schmidt Nr.4	Thorn
5		Westfälisches Ulanen-Regiment Nr.5	Düsseldorf
6		Thüringisches Ulanen-Regiment Nr.6	Hanau
7		Ulanen-Regiment Großherzog Friedrich von Baden Nr.7	Saarbrücken
8		Ulanen-Regiment Graf zu Dohna Nr.8	Gumbinnen, Stallupönen
9		2. Pommersches Ulanen-Regiment Nr.9	Demmin
10		Ulanen-Regiment Prinz August von Württemberg Nr.10	Züllichau
11		Ulanen-Regiment Graf Haeseler Nr.11	Saarburg
12		Lithauisches Ulanen-Regiment Nr.12	Insterburg
13		Königs-Ulanen-Regiment Nr.13	Hannover
14		2. Hannoversches Ulanen-Regiment Nr.14	Avold, Mörchingen
15		Schleswig-Holsteinisches Ulanen-Regiment Nr.15	Saarburg
16		Ulanen-Regiment Hennigs von Treffenfeld Nr.16	Saarburg
17		Kgl. Sächs.1. Ulanen-Regiment Kaiser Franz Josef von Österreich, König von Ungarn Nr.17	Oschatz
18		Kgl. Sächs.2. Ulanen-Regiment Nr.18	Leipzig
19		Ulanen-Regiment König Karl Nr.19	Ulm, Wiblingen
20		Ulanen-Regiment König Wilhelm I Nr.20	Ludwigsburg
21		Kgl. Sächs.3. Ulanen-Regiment Kaiser Wilhelm II, König von Preußen Nr.21	Chemnitz
1	Bavaria	Kgl.Bayer. 1.Ulanen Regiment	Bamberg
2	Bavaria	Kgl.Bayer. 2.Ulanen Regiment	Ansbach

== Sources ==
- Farwell, Byron (2001). The Encyclopedia of Nineteenth-Century Land Warfare: an Illustrated World View. W.W Norton & Company, New York. ISBN 0-393-04770-9.
- Meyer, Friedrich (1888). Das Königlische Bayerische 2. Ulanen Regiment König 1863 - 1888. M. Eichinger, k.b. Hofbuchhandlung. Ansbach, Germany.
