= 2nd Guards Uhlans =

2nd Guard Uhlan Regiment
- Garde-Ulanen-Regiment Nr.2
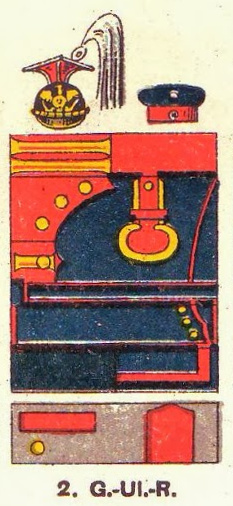
- Pre-war colour scheme of the uniform of the regiment.
- Active: 1819–1919
- Countries: Prussia; German Empire
- Branch: Prussian Army
- Type: Cavalry
- Role: Uhlans
- Part of: Guards Cavalry Division
- Garrison/HQ: Berlin
- Anniversaries: 27 February 1819
- Engagements: Austro-Prussian War; Franco-Prussian War; World War I

Commanders
- Notable commanders: Ludwig Karl Maria Graf von Maldeghem

The 2nd Guards Uhlan Regiment (German: Königlich Preußisches 2. Garde-Ulanen Regiment) was a cavalry regiment of the Prussian Army formed in 1819 in Potsdam, Prussia, and served as a Guards regiment garrisoned in Berlin.

== Regiment history ==
By order of the King Frederick William III of Prussia, the regiment was first formed in 1817 in the Grand Duchy of Posen as the Posensche Garde Landwehr Squadron. Garrisoned in Posen, in 1819 the light cavalry Landwehr regiment was merged with the Litthauische Guard Landwehr Squadron (1818) and the Thüringische and Clevische Guard Landwehr squadron to form the Guard Landwehr Cavalry Regiment. The regiment garrison on its reformation moved to Potsdam and by 3 August 1821 its size was increased by another four landwehr squadrons.

By 1821 however the decision was also made to divide the regiment into the 1st and 2nd Guard Landwehr Cavalry Regiment. On 30 March 1826 the regiment received the designation 2. Guard Uhlan (Landwehr) Regiment, which on 2 October 1851 was changed to be the 2 Guard Uhlan Regiment. Prior to the Franco-Prussian War of 1870-1871, the regiment was garrisoned in Berlin and Charlottenburg, when a new barracks was built in the borough of Berlin-Moabit. Although mostly a reserve guards regiment, the regiment was first deployed to break up barricades erected in Berlin during the March Revolution of 1848.

The regiment was first fully deployed for the Austro-Prussian War in 1866, being deployed in Silesia and Bohemia and the Franco-Prussian War in 1870. In France, the regiment initially deployed in Lorraine before moving to assist in the Siege of Paris.

=== First World War ===
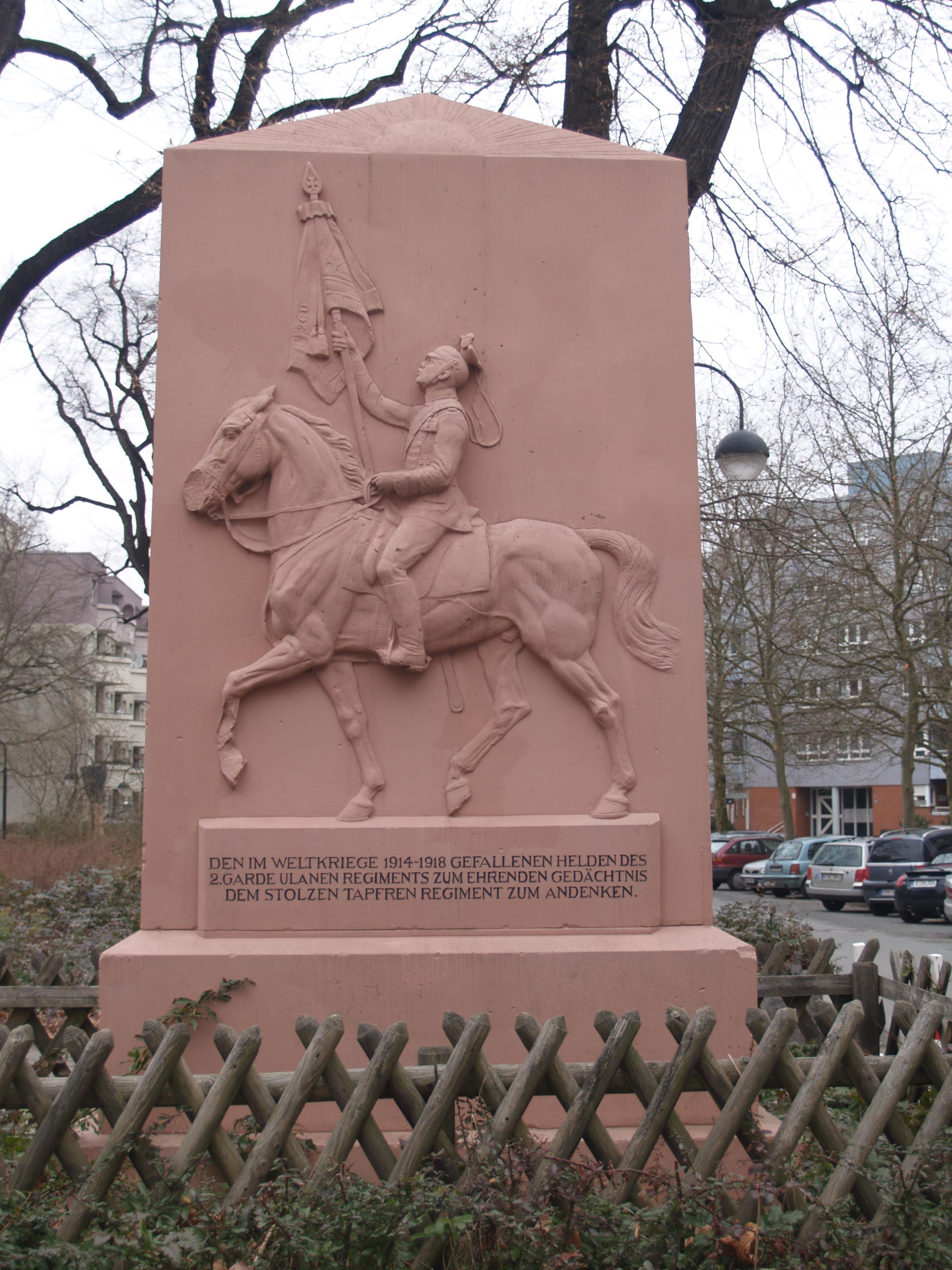
The Regiment war memorial located in Berlin-Moabit, unveiled in 1923

In World War I the regiment was part of the Guards Cavalry Division fighting on the Western Front. After the mobilization the regiment moved through Belgium and was involved in the First Battle of the Marne before the general retreat to Reims, where it dismounted and was involved in trench warfare as well as signaling operations. By September 1914, the regiment was divided, with 3rd and 4th Squadrons (2nd half-regiment) sent to the 2nd Cavalry Division and the 1st and 2nd Squadrons (1st half-regiment) remaining in the 2nd Guards Infantry Division.

1st half-regiment: On 20 November 1914, it moved into Russian Poland and by August 1915 moved into Vilna, as a part of the Gorlice–Tarnów Offensive. By the end of October 1915, the half-regiment was involved in operations in Courland and was involved in the capture of Riga in September 1917. In November 1917, the unit moved back to the Western Front where they remained till the end of the war.

2nd half-regiment: It remained first on the Western Front and in April 1915 was transferred to Galicia, but soon returned to the Western Front. In 1917 it again returned to the Eastern Front in action around Vilna before returning to the West, where it remained until the end of the war.

After the end of the war, in December 1918 the squadrons reunified and returned to Berlin, where the regiment was demobilized and then dissolved in 1919. The traditions of the regiment were continued by the Reichswehr, within the 4th Squadron of the 4th (Prussian) Reiter-Regiment in Perleberg. In 1923 a memorial containing the names of members of the regiment killed during the war was unveiled in Berlin-Moabit by the last commander of the regiment, Ludwig Karl Maria Graf von Maldeghem.

== Uniform ==
The peacetime uniform was a traditional Uhlan uniform consisting of a Ulanka tunic of red and blue with gold facings. A czapka with blue top and white plume was worn in full dress. These colourful uniforms were replaced excepting ceremonial situations in 1913 by the Feldgrau service uniform with brown leather boots and straps and the Tschapka covered by a feldgrau fabric covering.

== Regiment commanders ==
years	Rank	Name
1866 – 1871	Oberst	Prince Heinrich of Hesse and by Rhine
16 April 1874 – 14 June 1875	Oberstleutnant	Carl Friedrich Franz Victor von Alten
15 June 1875 – 2 March 1880	Oberst	Louis Otto von Hesberg
19 June 1886 – 22 October 1886	Major	Karl von Stünzner
17 April 1888 – 15 April 1889	Oberst	Robert von Massow
16 April 1889 – 17 August 1893	Oberst	Karl Botho zu Eulenburg
1 October 1903 – 12 September 1906	Oberst	Otto von Garnier
13 September 1906 - 31 March 1912	Oberstleutnant/Oberst	Karl-Ulrich von Bülow
April 1912 - August 1916	Oberstleutnant	Hans Leopold Freiherr von Maltzahn
August 1916 – 1919	Oberstleutnant	Ludwig Karl Maria Graf von Maldeghem

== See also ==
- List of Imperial German cavalry regiments
