= Charlotte Wedell =

Mathematician

Charlotte Bolette Sophie, Baroness Wedell-Wedellsborg (27 January 1862 – 22 July 1953) was one of four women mathematicians to attend the inaugural International Congress of Mathematicians, held in Zurich in 1897.

== Early life and background ==
Wedell was originally from Denmark, the daughter of Vilhelm Ferdinand, Baron Wedell-Wedellsborg (of the Wedel noble family) and Louise Marie Sophie, Countess Schulin, and the granddaughter of Johan Sigismund Schulin (1808–1880).

== Career ==
At the time of the Congress, in 1897, she had just completed a doctorate at the University of Lausanne in Switzerland, with Adolf Hurwitz as an unofficial mentor. The subject of her dissertation was the application of elliptic functions to the construction of the Malfatti circles.

At the congress, Wedell was listed as being affiliated with the University of Göttingen. The other three women at the congress were Iginia Massarini, Vera von Schiff, and Charlotte Scott. None were speakers; the first Congress with a woman as a speaker was in 1912.

== Personal life ==
Wedell married engineer Eugène Tomasini in Copenhagen in 1898; they divorced in 1909.
