= Johann von Dallwitz =

German politician (1855–1919)

Nikolaus Michael Louis Johann (Hans) von Dallwitz (29 September 1855 – 2 August 1919) was a German lawyer and politician who served during the German Empire in Prussia, Anhalt and Alsace-Lorraine.

== Biography ==
Dallwitz was born in Breslau (today, Wrocław) in the Province of Silesia. After graduating from the Gymnasium of Dresden, Dallwitz studied law at the universities of Bonn and Strasbourg. Between 1886 and 1899, he served as the Landrat (district administrator) of the district of Lüben (today, Lubin). In 1894, he was elected to the Prussian House of Representatives as a member of the German Conservative Party, serving until 1900, when he was made a Regierungsrat (government councilor) in Posen (today, Poznań). In 1902, he became a minister of state in the government of the Duchy of Anhalt and, from 1903 to 1909, he was Anhalt's minister-president. In 1909, he was appointed the Oberpräsident of the province of Silesia. From June 1910 to April 1914, he was the interior minister of Prussia in the cabinet of Chancellor Theobald von Bethmann Hollweg. After a conflict with Bethmann-Hollweg over electoral reform, Dallwitz resigned from his post.

In April 1914, Kaiser Wilhelm II appointed Dallwitz as Reichsstatthalter (imperial governor) of the imperial territory of Alsace-Lorraine as the successor to Count Karl von Wedel who resigned in the aftermath of the Zabern Affair. During his tenure, Dallwitz advocated for joining the territory to Prussia. However, the outbreak of the First World War and the longstanding conflict between the populations of Alsace-Lorraine and Prussia made this untenable. Dallwitz resigned on 14 October 1918, less than a month before the end of the war and the empire's collapse in the German revolution of 1918–1919. He died in August 1919 at his estate, Gut Bossee in Westensee.

== Sources ==
- Paul Wentzcke, Dallwitz, Hans von in Neue Deutsche Biographie (NDB), Vol. 3, Duncker & Humblot, Berlin, 1957, p. 493.
