= Moriz von Lyncker =

Prussian officer

Moriz Freiherr von Lyncker
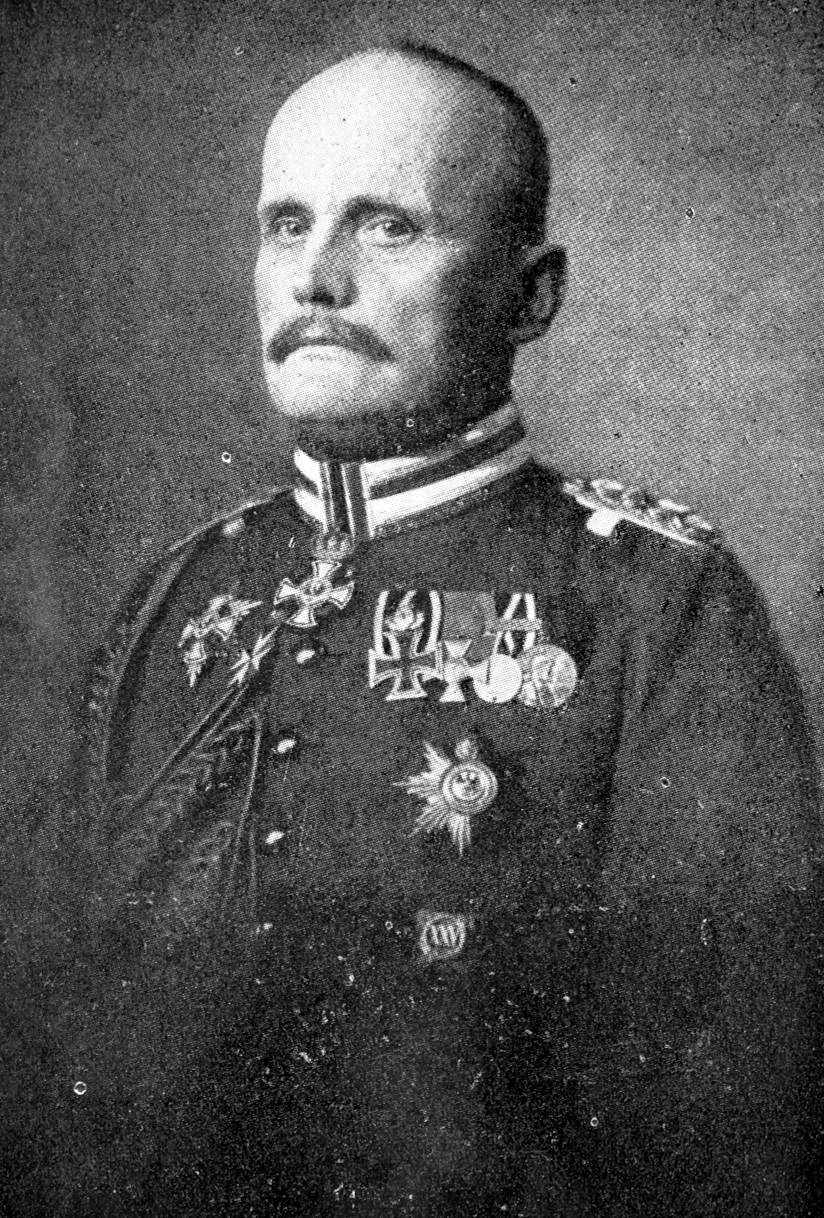
- Born: 30 January 1853; Spandau, Kingdom of Prussia
- Died: 20 January 1932 (aged 78); Demnitz, Free State of Prussia, Weimar Republic
- Military career
- Allegiance: (Kingdom of Prussia) Prussia (German Empire) Imperial Germany
- Branch: Prussian Army; German Imperial Army
- Service years: 1870–1919
- Rank: Generaloberst
- Commands: 3rd (Queen Elizabeth) Guards Grenadiers; 1st Garde-Infanterie-Brigade; 19th Division; Reichsmilitärgericht
- Conflicts: Franco-Prussian War; First World War
- Awards: Pour le Merite

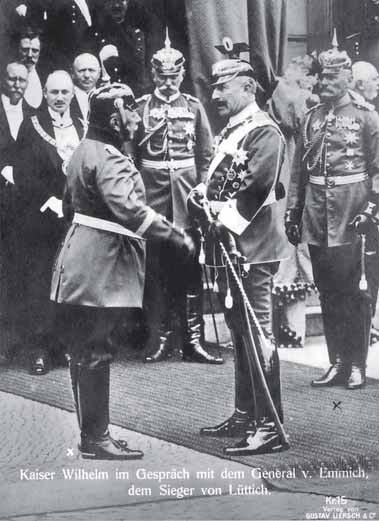
Lyncker (right) watching Wilhelm II and the victor of Liège, General Otto von Emmich, 1914

Moriz Freiherr von Lyncker (30 January 1853 – 20 January 1932) was a Prussian officer of the German Empire and Chief of the Military Cabinet of Emperor Wilhelm II.

He was one of the general adjutants of the Kaiser during World War I with Oskar von Chelius, Hans von Plessen, and Hans von Gontard.

== Life ==
Lyncker was born in Spandau, Prussia, into a military family, with his father, his father-in-law and two brothers being officers. He took part in the Franco-Prussian War of 1870-71, and two of his sons died in the First World War.

His association with the Prussian royal family began when he served as aide-de-camp to Crown Prince Frederick William as a captain. Subsequently Lyncker was appointed military mentor to the adolescent Crown Prince Wilhelm and Prince Eitel Friedrich for three years, until 1898. After resuming his regular career, he successively commanded a Guards regiment and brigade, before taking up leadership of the 19th Division at Hannover in 1905.

After the sudden death of the Chief of the Military Cabinet, General Dietrich von Hülsen-Haeseler, von Lyncker was on 17 November 1908 appointed to the post. He was responsible for personnel matters of the Prussian army and during First World War he was one of the closest aides to Kaiser Wilhelm II. He was present at the famous Imperial War Council of 8 December 1912.

He has been evaluated as "politically innocent, intellectually mediocre, with subservient devotion to Wilhelm II."

On the other hand, as the First World War progressed and the Kaiser withdrew into an atmosphere of "fear of the world and flight from reality", he worked with Georg Alexander von Müller, Chief of the Imperial Naval Cabinet, at great lengths to persuade him to spend more time on the business of the government in Berlin.

By 10 August 1914 he was considering replacing Helmuth von Moltke with Erich von Falkenhayn as Chief of the German General Staff. After the failure of the Battle of the Marne it was his duty to convince von Moltke to leave.

After 1915 he was ready to moderate Germany's aims to achieve peace, but still demanded that the Reich should retain Belgium or at least the Belgian ports for future use against Britain. Like Falkenhayn, he wanted a compromise peace with the Russian Empire and a substantial victory over Britain and France.

He died in Demnitz, Germany.

=== Ranks ===
- 1870: Fahnenjunker
- 1895-1898: Leutnant ... Oberst
- 1901: Generalmajor
- 1905: Generalleutnant
- 1909: General der Infanterie
- 1918: Generaloberst

== Honours ==
German orders and decorations

- Grand Cross of the Order of the Red Eagle, with Crown (Prussia)
- Knight of the Royal Order of the Crown, 1st Class (Prussia)
- Iron Cross (1870), 2nd Class (Prussia)
- Commander's Cross of the Royal House Order of Hohenzollern (Prussia)
- Knight of Justice of the Johanniter Order (Prussia)
- Service Award Cross (Prussia)
- Pour le Mérite (military), 2 November 1917 (Prussia)
- Grand Cross of the Order of the Zähringer Lion, 1909 (Baden)
- Grand Cross of the Merit Order of Philip the Magnanimous, 19 August 1909 (Hesse and by Rhine)
- Grand Cross of the Order of the Württemberg Crown (Württemberg)
- Grand Cross of the Friedrich Order, with Crown (Württemberg)

Foreign orders and decorations

- Grand Cross of the Austrian Imperial Order of Leopold, 1910 (Austria-Hungary)
- Knight of the Imperial Order of the Iron Crown, 1st Class, 1909 (Austria-Hungary)
- Knight of the Imperial Austrian Order of Franz Joseph, 1877 (Austria-Hungary)
- Grand Cross of the Order of the Dannebrog (Denmark)
- Commander Grand Cross of the Royal Order of the Sword (Sweden)

== Sources ==
- Holger Afflerbach (Hrsg.): Kaiser Wilhelm II. als Oberster Kriegsherr im Ersten Weltkrieg. Quellen aus der militärischen Umgebung des Kaisers 1914 - 1918, Munich: Oldenbourg 2005, ISBN 3-486-57581-3 (Umfangreiche Sammlung von Briefen Lynckers an seine Frau über den Kaiser in der Kriegszeit)
- Ekkehart P. Guth (1987). "Lyncker, Moriz Freiherr von". Neue Deutsche Biographie (in German). Vol. 15. Berlin: Duncker & Humblot. pp. 587–588.
- Biographische Skizze in: Kaiser Wilhelm II als Oberster Kriegsherr im Ersten Weltkrieg, hrsg. von Holger Afflerbach, München 2005 (Inhaltsverzeichnis, Akademie Aktuell: Rezension), Heft 1/2007, S.37f.
