= German Imperial War Council of 8 December 1912 =

1912 informal conference of German military leaders; important step towards WWI

The German Imperial War Council of 8 December 1912 was an informal conference of some of the highest military leaders of the German Empire. Meeting at the Stadtschloss in Berlin, they discussed and debated the tense military and diplomatic situation in Europe at the time. As a result of the Russian Great Military Program announced in November, Austria-Hungary's concerns about Serbian successes in the First Balkan War, and certain British communications, the possibility of war was a prime topic of the meeting.

In the continuing debate on the causes of World War I, historians like Fritz Fischer, John C. G. Röhl and Pierre Renouvin consider the conference a decisive step to war, long before the July Crisis.

== Background ==
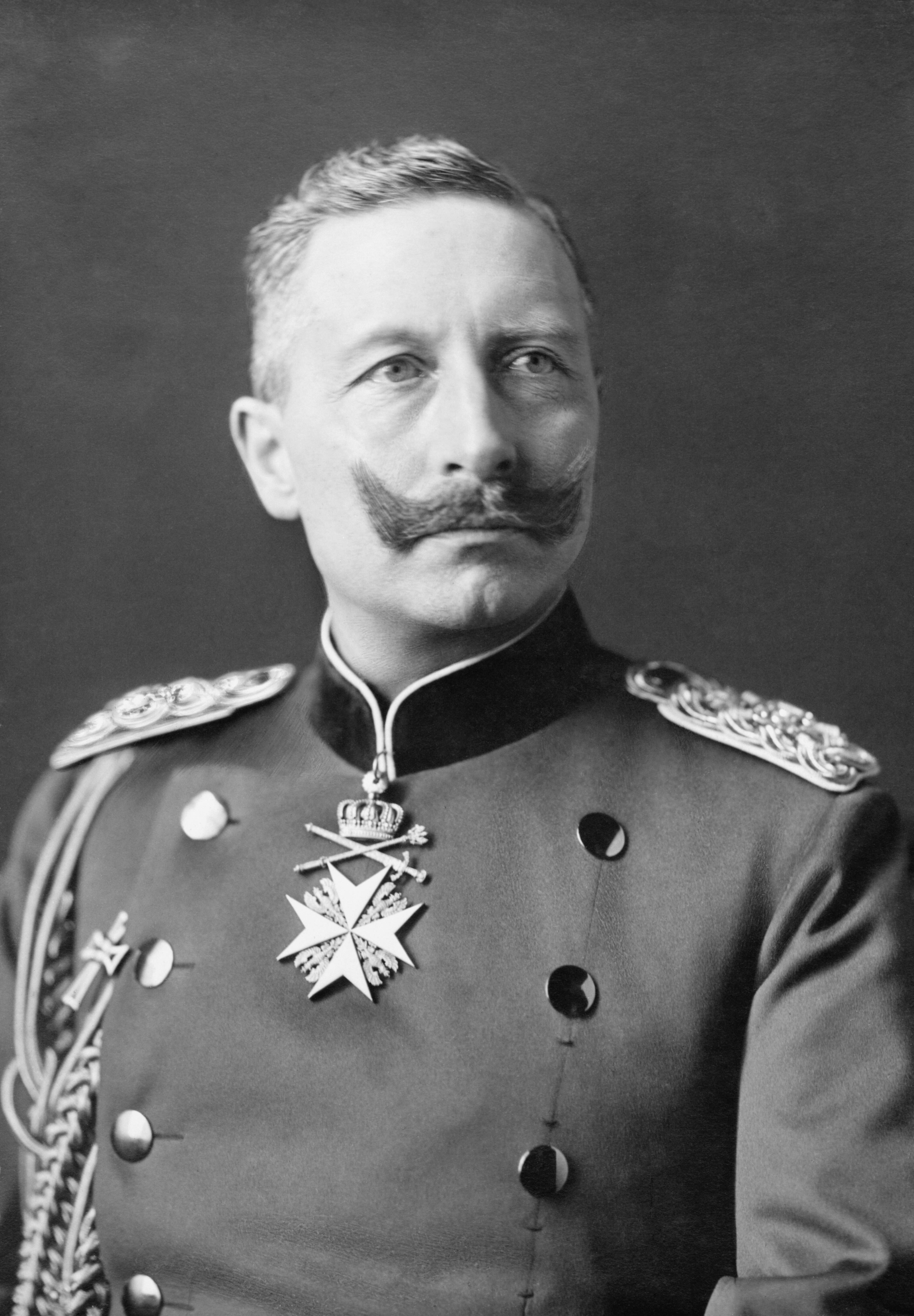
Wilhelm II

In the First Balkan War of 1912, the Balkan League formed by Serbia, Bulgaria, Montenegro and Greece under Russian patronage quickly defeated the forces of the Ottoman Empire. In Austria-Hungary especially, the Serbian strengthening was seen with increasing discontent, and the German chancellor Theobald von Bethmann Hollweg urged Emperor Wilhelm II to declare his solidarity according to the Triple Alliance—which Wilhelm did, however overstating the case when on 22 November 1912 he openly proclaimed 'the German support under any circumstances'.

Trying to appease the growing sense of alienation, Bethmann Hollweg had his Foreign Office state secretary Alfred von Kiderlen-Waechter publish a newspaper article in the Norddeutsche Allgemeine Zeitung advising Austria-Hungary against a military action, which in turn caused annoyance in Vienna. The chancellor ultimately provoked a diplomatic crisis, when in a Reichstag speech on 2 December he publicly confirmed the alliance with Austria-Hungary. Lord Chancellor Richard Haldane affirmed the concerns of the British government to the German ambassador Prince Karl Max von Lichnowsky and declared that the British would not remain passive in the case of an Austro–Hungarian attack on Serbia, nor would they tolerate any aggression of Germany against France on that occasion.

Kaiser Wilhelm II read Lichnowsky's report of his meeting with Haldane on the morning of Sunday, 8th Dec. The report left Wilhelm furious, lamenting that in the 'Germanic struggle for existence' the British, blinded by envy and inferiority feelings, join the Slavs (Russia) and their Romanic accessories (France). He immediately summoned the 'war council' for 11 AM that same day.

== Attendees ==
Attendees included Kaiser Wilhelm II, Admiral Alfred von Tirpitz (the Naval State Secretary), Admiral Georg Alexander von Müller (the Chief of the German Imperial Naval Cabinet), General von Moltke (the Army's Chief of Staff), and Admiral August von Heeringen (the Chief of the Naval General Staff). One source also claims that the Chief of the German Imperial Military Cabinet General Moriz von Lyncker attended, and also General Josias von Heeringen, the Prussian Minister of War (and brother of Admiral von Heeringen), but no other of the four primary sources supports their attendance, and one primary source specifically states the War Minister was not invited. All sources agree that Chancellor Bethmann Hollweg was not there. The importance of this meeting can be seen in that the leaders of both the German Army and Navy attended.

== Discussions ==
Wilhelm II called British balance of power principles "idiocy," but agreed that their statement was a “desirable clarification” of British policy. His opinion was that Austria-Hungary should attack Serbia that December, and if “Russia supports the Serbs, which she evidently does…then war would be unavoidable for us, too,” and that this would be better now than later, after completion of (the just begun) massive modernization and expansion of the Russian army and railway system toward Germany. Moltke agreed. In his professional military opinion "a war is unavoidable and the sooner the better". Moltke "wanted to launch an immediate attack."

Both Wilhelm II and the Army leadership agreed that if a war were necessary it were best launched soon. Admiral Tirpitz, however, asked for a “postponement of the great fight for one and a half years” because the Navy was not ready for a general war that included Britain as an opponent. He insisted that the completion of the construction of the U-boat base at Heligoland and the widening of the Kiel Canal were the Navy's prerequisites for war. The British historian John Röhl has pointed out the coincidence that the date for completion of the widening of the Kiel Canal was the summer of 1914, but a reading of the report of the conference shows no agreement as to a war in 1914. However, Tirpitz did say that the Navy wanted to wait until the Kiel Canal was ready in summer 1914 before any war could start. Though Moltke objected to the postponement of the war as unacceptable, Wilhelm sided with Tirpitz. Moltke yielded "only reluctantly."

== Historical significance ==
Historians more sympathetic to the Entente, such as British historian John Röhl, frequently see this as a conference as setting a time when a war was to begin, namely the summer of 1914. It was clearly established that, if there was going to be a war, the German Army wanted it to commence before the new Russian armaments program began to bear fruit.

Historians more sympathetic to the government of Wilhelm II often reject the importance of this War Council as only showing the thinking, and recommendations of those present, with no decisions taken. They often cite the passage from Admiral Muller's diary (below), which states: "That was the end of the conference. The result amounted to almost nothing."

Röhl is on safer ground when he argues that even if this War Council did not reach a binding decision it does nonetheless offer a clear view of their intentions, or at least their thoughts. Röhl also points out a list of actions that were definitely or apparently taken as a result of the conference:

- The Navy was ordered to scrap plans for war with Russia only, and prepare for naval war with Britain from day one of the inevitable conflict;
- A press campaign was ordered to drum up support for German intervention on the side of Austria-Hungary (the campaign began the next day), even if war with Russia resulted;
- The Kaiser ordered a new Naval Expansion Bill prepared (it was eventually killed by Chancellor Bethmann Hollweg)
- A press campaign for the proposed naval expansion was begun by Admiral Tirpitz within a few days (Bethmann wrote to the Kaiser about it on December 18, asking that it be stopped for the moment at least);
- The Kaiser ordered a new Army Expansion Bill prepared, the largest peacetime expansion of the German Army ever (this was supported by Bethmann Hollweg);
- Food and fodder for the Army started to be accumulated;
- Tests were conducted to see how quickly canned goods production could be increased in wartime;
- A 'Standing Committee on Mobilization' was created;
- The War College courses for staff officers were shortened, and older officers retired to ready the Army for possible war;
- Gold reserves were moved back to Germany, bank deposits were removed from British banks, and loans were called in from abroad, putting Germany in a stronger cash position when war broke out;
- High-ranking German military men started drawing down their savings accounts and sending their money abroad, or putting it into safety deposit boxes as gold, to preserve their wealth if the war caused banks to fail;
- The plan for troop mobilization to the Eastern front only was dropped;
- Kaiser Wilhelm told numerous German diplomats and the Swiss ambassador in Berlin that war would probably break out in the next few years.

Altogether, the scenario outlined at the conference was so similar to the events of the 1914 that Röhl termed it a "dress rehearsal" for the July Crisis.

== Report by Admiral Mueller ==
The following is an English translation of Admiral Mueller's report:

Sunday: summoned to the palace to see His Majesty (Kaiser Wilhelm II) at 11 o’clock along with Tirpitz, Heeringen (Vice Admiral), and General von Moltke. H.M. with a telegraphic report on the political situation sent by the ambassador in London, Prince Lichnowski. As Grey’s spokesman, Haldane informed Lichnowski that if we attack France, England will come to France’s aid, for England cannot tolerate a disturbance in the European balance of power. H.M. welcomed this message as providing the desired clarification for all those who have been lulled into a false sense of security by the recently friendly English press.

H.M. painted the following picture:

'Austria must deal firmly with the Slavs living outside its borders (the Serbs) if it does not want to lose control over the Slavs under the Austrian monarchy. If Russia were to support the Serbs, which she is apparently already doing (Sazonov's remark that Russia will go straight into Galicia if the Austrians march into Serbia), war would be inevitable for us. But there is hope that Bulgaria, Romania, and Albania—and perhaps even Turkey—will take our side. Bulgaria has already offered Turkey an alliance. We really went to great lengths to persuade the Turks.'

Recently, H.M. also tried to convince the crown prince of Romania, who stopped here on his way to Brussels, to come to an agreement with Bulgaria. If these powers ally themselves with Austria, it will free us up to throw our full weight behind a war against France. According to His Majesty, the fleet will naturally have to prepare for war against England. After Haldane’s statement, the possibility of a war against Russia alone—as discussed by the chief of the Admiralty in his last talk—will not be considered. So, immediate submarine warfare against English troop transports on the Schelde River or near Dunkirk, mine warfare up to the Thames.

To Tirpitz: rapid construction of additional submarines, etc. A conference is recommended for all interested naval offices.

Gen. v. Moltke: "I consider a war inevitable—the sooner, the better. But we should do a better job of gaining popular support for a war against Russia, in line with the Kaiser's remarks." H.M. confirmed this and asked the secretary of state to use the press to work toward this end. T. called attention to the fact that the navy would gladly see a major war delayed by one and a half years. Moltke said that even then the navy would not be ready, and the army's situation would continue to worsen, since due to our limited financial resources our opponents are able to arm themselves more rapidly.

That was the end of the meeting. There were almost no results.

The chief of the general staff says: the sooner war comes, the better; however, he hasn't concluded from this that we should give Russia or France, or even both, an ultimatum that would trigger a war for which they would carry the blame.

I wrote to the chancellor in the afternoon about influencing the press.
