= Max von Bock und Polach =

Prussian field marshal (1842-1915)

Max von Bock and Polach
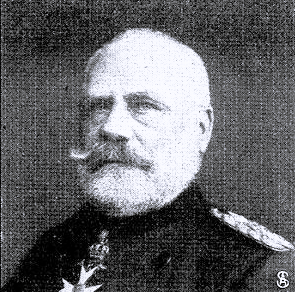
- Born: Max von Bock and Polach; 5 September 1842
- Died: 4 March 1915 (aged 72)
- Allegiance: Kingdom of Prussia
- Branch: Prussian Army
- Rank: Field Marshal

Max von Bock und Polach (5 September 1842 – 4 March 1915) was a Prussian officer and Field Marshal. He served in the military during the three wars of German unification under the leadership of Prime Minister Otto von Bismarck.

== Early life ==
Max came from the Meissen Uradelsgeschlecht von Bock und Polach and was the second son of the Prussian captain Ernst von Bock und Polach (1799-1849). His older brother was the future Lord Mayor of Mülheim an der Ruhr, Karl von Bock und Polach (1840-1902).

== Military career ==
After visiting the Cadet Corps, Bock und Polach joined the military, along with his brother Karl, in 1860, as a second lieutenant in Infantry Regiment No. 55 a. In 1864 he fought in the German-Danish War of 1866. During the Franco-German War, he served as adjutant of the Lieutenant-General Adolf von Glümer, a Member of Staff of the 13th Division and was awarded the Iron Cross II Class.

He was promoted to the rank of captain. He returned from the war and taught at the War College in Hanover. Shortly afterwards, he was transferred to Infantry Regiment No. 16. In 1872 he became à la suite of the 6th Westphalian Infantry Regiment "Graf Bülow of Dennewitz" No. 55.

Von Bock und Polach became a Major General in 1890. He returned a year later as a member of the Upper Military Study Commission and quartermaster in the Great General Staff. With his promotion to lieutenant general in 1893, he was appointed commander of the 20th Division in Hanover. Von Bock und Polach was then promoted to general of infantry in 1897, the Commanding General of the Guard Corps.

He led the XIV Army Corps in Karlsruhe from 27 January 1902 to 10 September 1907. In 1907 he became inspector general of the III Army inspection in Hanover. On 18 September 1908 he was appointed Colonel-General. Together with Alfred von Schlieffen and Colmar von der Goltz, he was appointed Field marshal by the Emperor at the New Year celebration on 1 January 1911.

In autumn 1912 he submitted his resignation, which was granted with effect from 13 September 1912.

== Family ==
Von Bock und Polach married on 19 April 1873 in Mehrum House, Mathilde Baroness von Plettenberg (1850-1924). They had three daughters.

== Honours ==
German orders and decorations

- Prussia:
  - Knight of the Red Eagle, 4th Class with Swords, 9 April 1864; 2nd Class with Oak Leaves and Swords on Ring, 18 January 1892; 1st Class, 1 September 1898; Grand Cross
  - Knight of the Royal Crown Order, 4th Class with Swords, 1864; 3rd Class, 20 September 1866; 1st Class
  - Iron Cross (1870), 2nd Class
  - Knight's Cross of the Royal House Order of Hohenzollern, 23 September 1879; Grand Commander's Cross
  - Service Award Cross
  - Knight of the Black Eagle, 27 January 1902; with Collar
- Hohenzollern: Cross of Honour of the Princely House Order of Hohenzollern, 1st Class
- Baden:
  - Commander of the Zähringer Lion, 2nd Class with Oak Leaves, 1888
  - Knight of the House Order of Fidelity, 1904; with Star in Diamonds, 1907
- Bavaria: Grand Cross of the Military Merit Order
- Brunswick: Grand Cross of Henry the Lion, 1895; with Swords
- (Saxe-Coburg and Gotha) (Duchy of Saxe-Altenburg) (Saxe-Meiningen) Ernestine duchies: Grand Cross of the Saxe-Ernestine House Order
- Hesse and by Rhine: Grand Cross of the Ludwig Order, 15 July 1910
- Lippe: Cross of Honour of the House Order of Lippe, 1st Class
- Mecklenburg: Grand Cross of the Wendish Crown, with Golden Crown
- Oldenburg: Grand Cross of Honour of the Order of Duke Peter Friedrich Ludwig
- Saxe-Weimar-Eisenach: Grand Cross of the White Falcon
- Saxony: Commander of the Albert Order, 1st Class, 1893
- Schaumburg-Lippe:
  - Cross of Honour of the House Order of Schaumburg-Lippe, 1st Class
  - Military Merit Medal, with Swords
- Württemberg:
  - Commander of the Friedrich Order, 1st Class, 1893
  - Grand Cross of the Württemberg Crown

Foreign orders and decorations

- Austrian Empire:
  - Knight of the Iron Crown, 3rd Class with War Decoration, 1864
  - Grand Cross of the Imperial Order of Leopold, 1900; in Diamonds, 1901
- Kingdom of Italy: Grand Cross of Saints Maurice and Lazarus
- Empire of Japan: Grand Cordon of the Rising Sun
- Netherlands: Grand Cross of the Order of Orange-Nassau
- Ottoman Empire: Order of Osmanieh, 1st Class
- Russian Empire: Knight of the White Eagle
- Siam: Grand Cross of the White Elephant
