= Von Heeringen =

Von Heeringen is a surname. Notable people with the surname include:

- August von Heeringen (1855–1927), German admiral, brother of Josias
- Josias von Heeringen (1850–1926), German general
