= Heinrich von Heß =

Austrian field marshal (1788–1870)

Heinrich Hermann Josef Freiherr von Heß
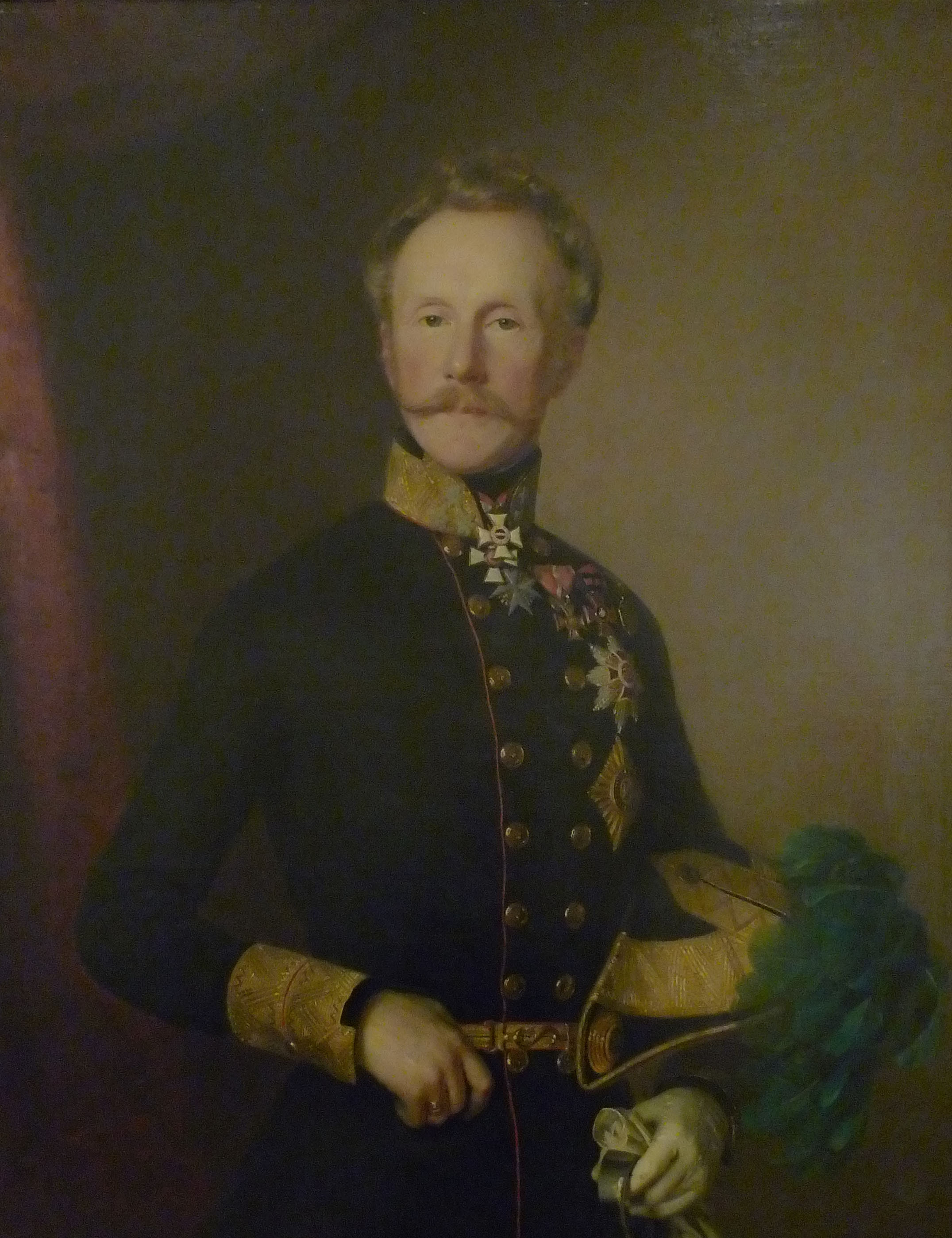
- von Hess in 1849
- Born: 17 March 1788; Vienna, Archduchy of Austria, Holy Roman Empire
- Died: 13 April 1870 (aged 82); Vienna, Austria-Hungary
- Military career
- Allegiance: Austrian Empire
- Service years: 1805–1860
- Rank: Feldmarschall
- Conflicts: War of the Fifth Coalition; War of the Sixth Coalition; First Italian War of Independence; Second Italian War of Independence
- Awards: Military Order of Maria Theresa

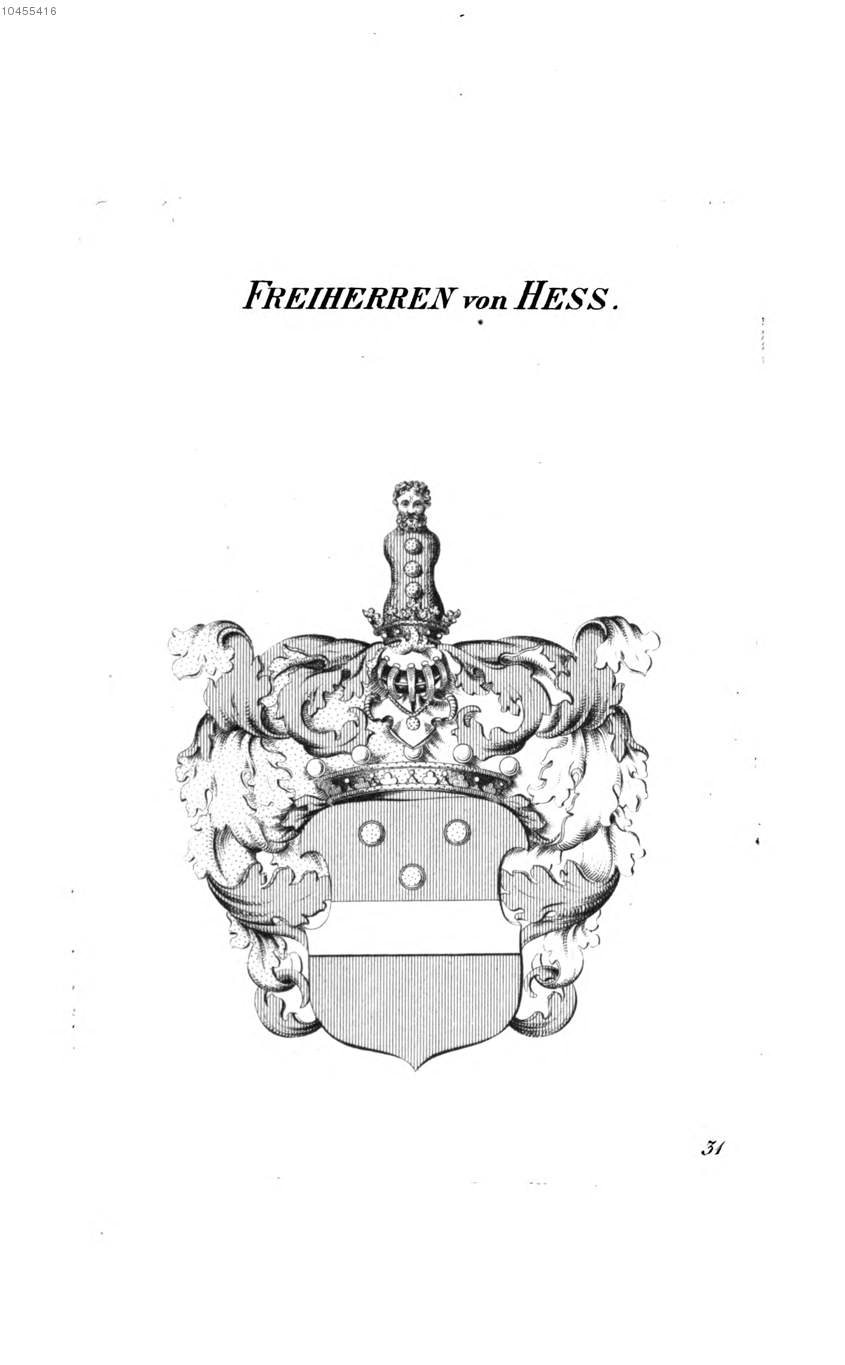
Arms of the Baron von Heß

Heinrich Hermann Josef Freiherr von Heß (alternatively: von Hess) (17 March 1788 – 13 April 1870) was an Austrian soldier and field marshal, who entered the army in 1805 and was soon employed as a staff officer on survey work.

He distinguished himself as a subaltern at Aspern and Wagram, and in 1813, as captain, again served on the staff. In 1815, he was with Karl Philipp, Prince of Schwarzenberg. He had, in the interval between the two wars, been employed as a military commissioner in Piedmont, and at the peace resumed this post, gaining knowledge which later prover invaluable to the Austrian army.

In 1831, when Radetzky became commander-in-chief in Austrian Italy, he took Heß as his chief of staff. This began the connection between two famous soldiers which, like that of Blücher and Gneisenau, is a classical example of harmonious co-operation between commander and chief of staff. Heß put into shape Radetzky's military ideas, in the form of new drill for each army, and, under their guidance, the Austrian army in North Italy, always on a war footing, became the best in Europe. From 1834 to 1848 Heß was employed in Moravia, at Vienna, etc., but, on the outbreak of revolution and war in the latter year, he was at once sent out to Radetzky as chief of staff.

In the two campaigns against King Charles Albert which followed, culminating in the victory of Novara, Heß's assistance to his chief was made still more valuable by his knowledge of the enemy, and the old field-marshal acknowledged his services in general orders. Lieut.-Fieldmarshal Heß was at once promoted Feldzeugmeister, made a member of the emperor's council, and Freiherr von Heß assumed at the same time the duties of quartermaster-general. Next year he became chief of the staff to the emperor.

He was often employed in missions to various capitals, and he appeared in the field in 1854 at the head of the Austrian army which intervened so effectually in the Crimean War. In 1859 he was sent to the Second Italian War of Independence after the early defeats. He became field-marshal in 1860, and a year later, on resigning his position as chief of staff, he was made captain of the Trabant guard. He died in Vienna in 1870.

== Orders and decorations ==
- Austrian Empire:
  - Commander of the Military Order of Maria Theresa, 1849
  - Grand Cross of the Royal Hungarian Order of St. Stephen, 1855
  - Grand Cross of the Imperial Order of Leopold
  - Military Merit Cross
- Baden: Grand Cross of the Zähringer Lion, 1840
- Kingdom of Bavaria:
  - Grand Cross of the Merit Order of St. Michael, 1840
  - Grand Cross of Merit of the Bavarian Crown, 1853
- Kingdom of Hanover: Grand Cross of the Royal Guelphic Order, 1850
- Grand Duchy of Hesse:
  - Grand Cross of the Merit Order of Philip the Magnanimous, 27 December 1840
  - Grand Cross of the Ludwig Order, 4 August 1858
- Kingdom of Prussia:
  - Pour le Mérite (military), 11 May 1814; with Crown, 18 June 1864
  - Knight of the Black Eagle
  - Knight of the Red Eagle, 1st Class with Swords
- Württemberg: Grand Cross of the Friedrich Order
- Duchy of Parma: Senator Grand Cross of the Constantinian Order of St. George, 1849
- Holy See:
  - Knight of the Supreme Order of Christ
  - Grand Cross of St. Gregory the Great
- Russian Empire:
  - Knight of St. George, 2nd Class, April 1849
  - Knight of St. Alexander Nevsky, in Diamonds
  - Knight of the White Eagle
  - Knight of St. Anna, 1st Class
  - Knight of St. Vladimir, 4th Class
- Kingdom of Sardinia: Commander of Saints Maurice and Lazarus
- Two Sicilies: Grand Cross of St. George of the Reunion
