= Friedrich von Scholl =

Prussian military officer (1846–1928)

His Excellency Friedrich von Scholl
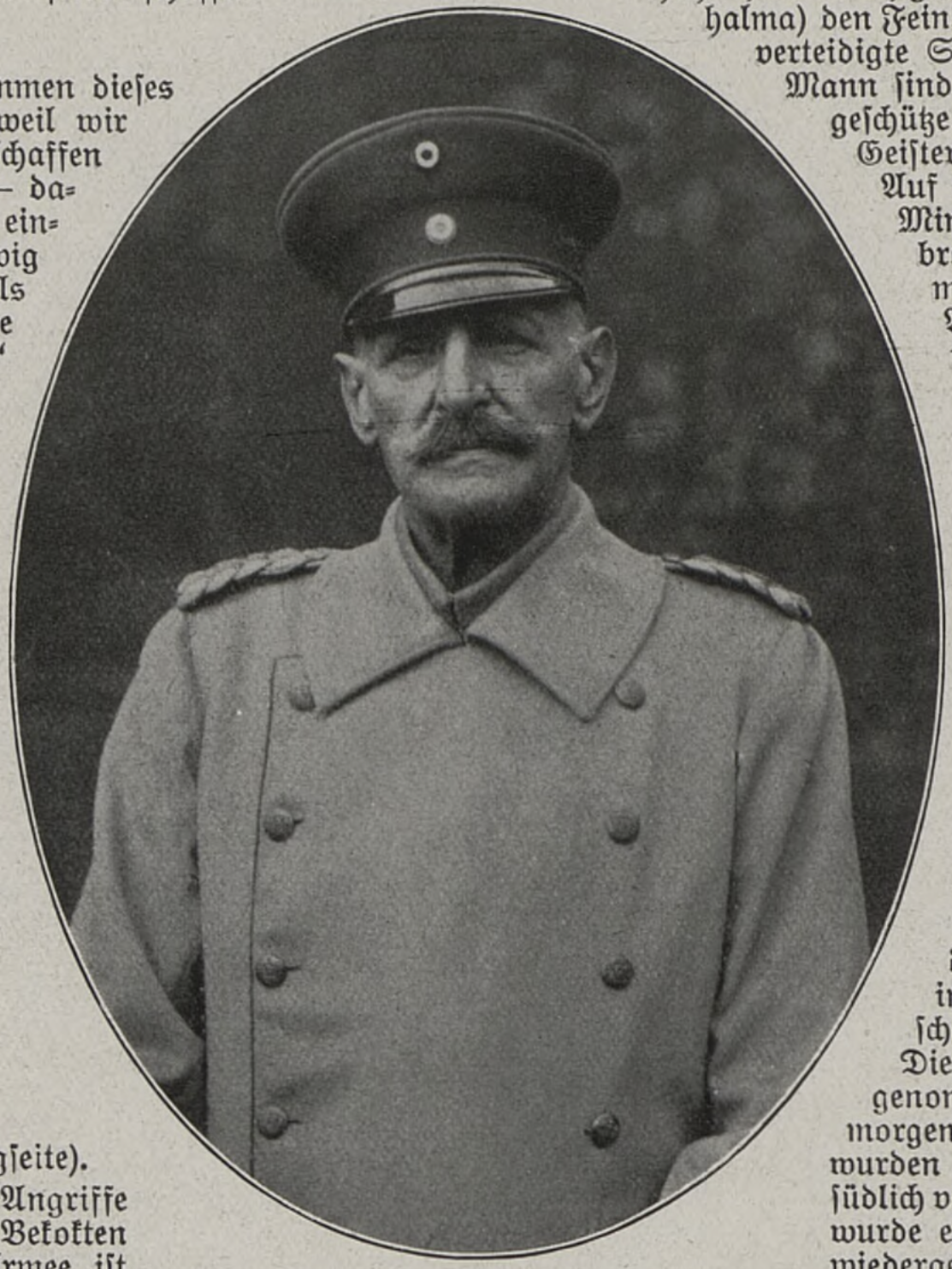
- Born: 25 October 1846; Darmstadt, Grand Duchy of Hesse
- Died: 2 October 1928 (aged 81); Potsdam, Free State of Prussia, Weimar Republic
- Military career
- Allegiance: Grand Duchy of Hesse; Kingdom of Prussia; German Empire
- Branch: (Grand Duchy of Hesse) Grand Ducal Hessian Army; Prussian Army; Imperial German Army
- Service years: 1863–1918
- Rank: Generaloberst
- Commands: 1st Guards Uhlans; Imperial Grand Headquarters
- Conflicts: Austro-Prussian War; Franco-Prussian War: Battle of Gravelotte; Siege of Metz; World War I

Friedrich von Scholl (25 October 1846 – 2 October 1928), born Friedrich Ludwig Karl Ernst Wilhelm Georg Scholl, was a Colonel General (German: Generaloberst) in the Prussian and Imperial German armies, and adjutant in the court of Kaiser Wilhelm II. He was a relative of physicist Wilhelm Hallwachs.

== Biography ==
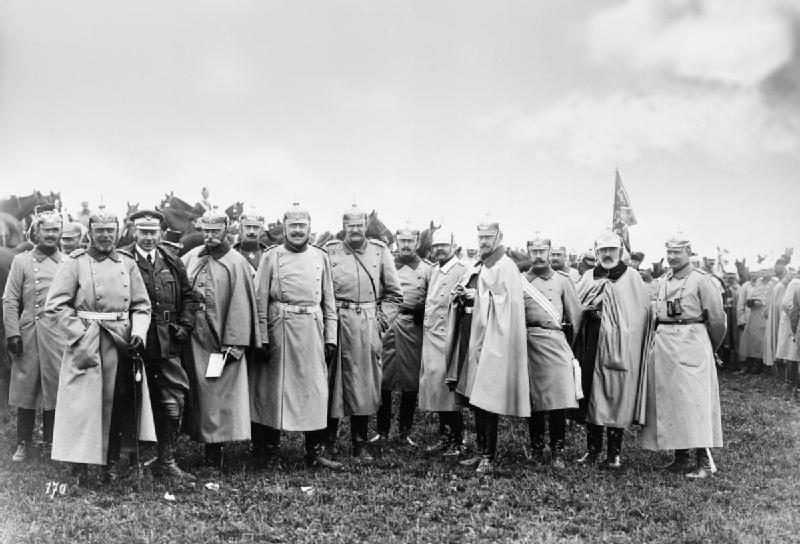
Scholl (seventh from left) with the Kaiser's adjutants during the maneuvers of 1905.

Born on 25 October 1846 in Darmstadt, part of the Grand Duchy of Hesse at the time, he was the son of Friedrich Scholl (1815–1875), a colonel in the Hessian army and Head of the Department of War. Following in his father's footsteps, Scholl joined the Hessian Army on 11 February 1863 as part of the 2nd Reiter (cavalry) Regiment and rose to the rank of Sekonde-Lieutenant (second lieutenant) on 7 September 1865.

During the 1866 Austro–Prussian War, Scholl fought for Hesse against Prussia. Following the war, Scholl joined the Prussian Army. Scholl spent over two years at a cavalry training center between September 1867 and November 1869, becoming an officer of the Prussian Army afterwards. During the 1870–71 Franco–Prussian War, Sekonde-Lieutenant Scholl fought for Prussia in the Battle of Gravelotte and Siege of Metz. During the war, Scholl was promoted to Oberleutnant (First Lieutenant). Scholl also was awarded the Iron Cross following the war. In 1877, Scholl became Rittmaster of a cavalry regiment. On 25 February 1880, Scholl was raised to the hereditary nobility of Hesse (now a part of the German Empire), and shortly later on 15 July 1880, Scholl was further made a member of the Imperial German nobility.

Starting on 11 December 1886, Scholl commanded his regiment from Potsdam. On 1 September 1887, Scholl was promoted to Major. The following June 19, Scholl became an aide to other generals in Kaiser Wilhelm II’s court. On 18 August 1891 Scholl was promoted to Oberstleutnant (Lieutenant Colonel). On 14 May 1894 Scholl was promoted to Oberst (Colonel). On 20 July 1897, Scholl was promoted to Generalmajor. On 18 May 1901, Scholl was promoted to Generalleutnant. On Christmas Day, 1905, Scholl was made General of the Cavalry. On 16 June 1913, Scholl was promoted to Generaloberst, the rank that he would hold during World War I, during which he was an adjutant general to Kaiser Wilhelm II, advising him throughout the war, at the end of which Scholl retired from active service.

== Personal life ==
Scholl married Adelheid Freiin Löw von und zu Steinfurth on 29 September 1877; they had a son, August (1879–1914), who was killed in the opening days of World War I.

== Dates of rank ==
- Leutnant – 7 September 1865
- Oberleutnant – 1 August 1871
- Major – 1 September 1887
- Oberstleutnant – 18 August 1891
- Oberst – 14 May 1894
- Generalmajor – 20 July 1897
- Generalleutnant – 18 May 1901
- Generaloberst – 16 June 1913

== Honours and awards ==
German

- Prussia:
  - Iron Cross (1870), 2nd Class on Black Band, 1871
  - Knight's Cross of the Royal House Order of Hohenzollern, 27 January 1892; Commander's Cross and Star
  - Knight of the Red Eagle, 3rd Class with Bow and Crown, 27 January 1893; with Swords, 1895; 2nd Class with Oak Leaves and Swords on Ring, 15 June 1898; with Star, 19 September 1901; Grand Cross, 1905
  - Service Award Cross
  - Knight of the Royal Crown Order, 1st Class
  - Knight of the Black Eagle, with Collar, 1905
- Hohenzollern: Commander's Cross of Honour of the Princely House Order of Hohenzollern
- Baden:
  - Grand Cross of the Zähringer Lion, 1905
  - Grand Cross of the Order of Berthold the First, 1907
- Bavaria:
  - Knight of the Merit Order of St. Michael, 2nd Class, 1890
  - Commander of Merit of the Bavarian Crown, 1897
  - Grand Cross of the Military Merit Order
- Brunswick: Grand Cross of the Order of Henry the Lion, 1902
- (Saxe-Coburg and Gotha) (Duchy of Saxe-Altenburg) (Saxe-Meiningen) Ernestine duchies: Commander of the Saxe-Ernestine House Order, 1st Class
- Grand Duchy of Hesse:
  - Knight of the Ludwig Order, 2nd Class, 18 August 1876; Grand Cross, 21 April 1910
  - Commander of the Merit Order of Philip the Magnanimous, 2nd Class, 17 December 1889; with Crown and Swords, 25 May 1892; 1st Class, 15 October 1894; Grand Cross with Crown, 25 August 1906
- Mecklenburg-Schwerin: Grand Cross of the Griffon
- Oldenburg: Commander of Honour of the Order of Duke Peter Friedrich Ludwig
- Saxe-Weimar-Eisenach: Grand Cross of the White Falcon
- Saxony: Grand Cross of the Albert Order
- Schaumburg-Lippe: Cross of Honour of the House Order of Schaumburg-Lippe, 1st Class
- Schwarzburg: Princely Schwarzburg Cross of Honour, 1st Class
- Waldeck and Pyrmont: Order of Merit, 1st Class
- Württemberg:
  - Commander of the Württemberg Crown, 1897; Grand Cross
  - Commander of the Friedrich Order, 1st Class, 1899

Foreign

- (Austrian Empire) (Kingdom of Hungary) Austria-Hungary:
  - Knight of the Iron Crown, 2nd Class, 1889
  - Commander of the Imperial Order of Leopold, 1891
  - Grand Cross of the Order of Franz Joseph, 1900
- Belgium: Grand Cordon of the Order of Leopold
- Bulgaria:
  - Grand Cross of St. Alexander
  - Grand Cross of Military Merit, in Brilliants
- Greece: Grand Cross of the Redeemer
- Italy:
  - Commander of Saints Maurice and Lazarus, 25 November 1892; Grand Cross, 16 July 1904
  - Grand Officer of the Crown of Italy, 25 September 1893; Grand Cross
- Luxembourg: Commander of the Oak Crown
- Netherlands:
  - Knight of the Netherlands Lion
  - Grand Cross of the Order of Orange-Nassau
- Ottoman Empire:
  - Order of the Medjidie, 1st Class
  - Gold and Silver Imtiaz Medals
- Persia: Order of the Lion and the Sun, 1st Class
- Portugal:
  - Grand Cross of the Royal Military Order of Our Lord Jesus Christ
  - Commander of the Royal Military Order of St. Benedict of Aviz
- Romania: Grand Officer of the Star of Romania
- Russia:
  - Knight of St. Alexander Nevsky, in Brilliants
  - Knight of the White Eagle
  - Knight of St. Anna, 2nd Class in Brilliants; 1st Class
  - Knight of St. Stanislaus, 2nd Class with Star
- Siam: Grand Officer of the Crown of Siam
- Sweden-Norway: Commander of the Sword, 1st Class, 12 July 1895
- United Kingdom: Honorary Knight Grand Cross of the Royal Victorian Order, 29 August 1906
