= Order of Philip the Magnanimous =

Military order of Hesse

Order of Merit of Philip the Magnanimous Verdienstorden Philipps des Großmütigen
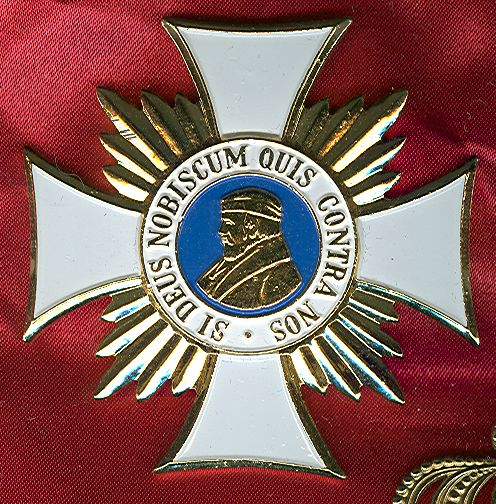
- Cross of the order

Awarded by The Grand Duke of Hesse
- Type: Order of Merit
- Established: 1 May 1840
- Motto: SI DEUS NOBISCUM QUIS CONTRA NOS
- Status: Monarchy dissolved in 1918
- Sovereign: Grand Duke of Hesse
- Grades: Grand Cross; Commander 1st Class; Commander 2nd Class; Cross of Honour; Knight 1st Class; Knight 2nd Class; Silver Cross

Statistics
- Last induction: 1918

Precedence
- Next (higher): Ludwig Order (before 1875); Order of the Golden Lion (after 1875)
- Next (lower): Order of the Star of Brabant
- Ribbon bar of the order

The Order of Merit of Philip the Magnanimous (German: Verdienstorden Philipps des Großmütigen) was an order of chivalry established by Louis II, Grand Duke of Hesse on 1 May 1840, the name day of Philip I, Landgrave of Hesse, in his honour to award extraordinary military or civil merit. It was the second-highest order of the Grand Duchy of Hesse before 1876, when it was displaced to third by the revived Order of the Golden Lion, the former paramount order of the Electorate of Hesse.

After the First World War and the fall of the German monarchies, the order—along with all other grand ducal decorations—was formally abolished in 1919.

== Overview ==
The order was initially divided into four grades: Grand Cross, Commanders 1st and 2nd classes, and knight. On the anniversary of its founding in 1849, a new class was created, the Silver Cross, with the introduction of crossed swords in gold or silver for the class. From 10 November 1859 the knight class was further divided into two grades, 1st and 2nd classes. In 1876, the order was renamed the "Grand Ducal Hessian Order of Philip" (German: Großherzoglich Hessischer Philipps-Orden), though that decree was withdrawn a year later.

From 1881, the order could be awarded with a golden crown, as a special distinction; the order with swords for military merit was from 1893 restricted to those with outstanding achievements during war. In 1900, another new class, the Cross of Honour (German: Ehrenkreuz) was created, which was below commander 2nd class and above knight 1st class. A final revision was made on 17 June 1911, with golden rays added to the cross arms of the Commander 1st Class grade.

== Recipients ==
=== Grand Crosses ===
- Alexander II of Russia
- Alexander of Battenberg
- Alexander, Prince of Erbach-Schönberg
- Prince Alexander of Hesse and by Rhine
- Alfred, Duke of Saxe-Coburg and Gotha
- Prince Arthur, Duke of Connaught and Strathearn
- Friedrich von Beck-Rzikowsky
- Theobald von Bethmann Hollweg
- Julius von Bose
- Otto von Bismarck
- Bruno, Prince of Ysenburg and Büdingen
- Bernhard von Bülow
- Stephan Burián von Rajecz
- Alexander Mountbatten, 1st Marquess of Carisbrooke
- Charles of Solms-Hohensolms-Lich
- Prince Charles of Hesse and by Rhine
- Rudolf von Delbrück
- Edward VII
- Karl von Einem
- Hermann von Eichhorn
- Woldemar Freedericksz
- Josias von Heeringen
- Georg von Hertling
- Hans Heinrich XV von Hochberg
- Dietrich von Hülsen-Haeseler
- Emich, Prince of Leiningen
- Prince Emil of Hesse
- Prince Ernest Augustus, 3rd Duke of Cumberland and Teviotdale
- Ernest Louis, Grand Duke of Hesse
- Ferdinand, Landgrave of Hesse-Homburg
- Prince Francis Joseph of Battenberg
- Ganga Singh
- Georg Donatus, Hereditary Grand Duke of Hesse
- Heinrich von Gagern
- Hans Heinrich XV, Prince of Pless
- Heinrich von Heß
- Gustav, Landgrave of Hesse-Homburg
- Gustav, Prince of Vasa
- Prince Heinrich of Hesse and by Rhine
- Prince Henry of Battenberg
- Hermann, Prince of Solms-Hohensolms-Lich
- Kamehameha V
- Prince Kraft of Hohenlohe-Ingelfingen
- Prince Leopold, Duke of Albany
- Louis II, Grand Duke of Hesse
- Louis III, Grand Duke of Hesse
- Louis IV, Grand Duke of Hesse
- Prince Louis of Battenberg
- Madho Rao Scindia
- Maximilian I of Mexico
- Moriz von Lyncker
- Edwin Freiherr von Manteuffel
- Georg Alexander von Müller
- Jean-Baptiste Nothomb
- Hugo von Radolin
- Gustav Waldemar von Rauch
- Karl von Schlitz
- Friedrich von Scholl
- Gustav von Senden-Bibran
- Heinrich von Stephan
- Otto Graf zu Stolberg-Wernigerode
- Prince Frederick William of Hesse-Kassel
- Alfred von Tirpitz
- Illarion Vorontsov-Dashkov
- Wilhelm von Wedell-Piesdorf
- Wilhelm I, German Emperor
- Ferdinand von Zeppelin

=== Commanders 1st Class ===
- Alfred Mordaunt Egerton
- Antoni Wilhelm Radziwiłł
- Leopold von Ranke
- Ludwig Freiherr von und zu der Tann-Rathsamhausen
- Karl von Wedel

=== Commanders 2nd Class ===
- August von Heeringen
- Paul Bronsart von Schellendorff
- Walther Bronsart von Schellendorff
- August von Mackensen
- Otto von Marchtaler
- Georg von der Marwitz
- Helmuth von Moltke the Younger
- Ernst von Prittwitz und Gaffron

=== Crosses of Honour ===
- Eberhard Graf von Schmettow

=== Knights 1st class ===
- Heinrich Bone
- George Victor, Prince of Waldeck and Pyrmont
- Oskar von Hutier

=== Others ===
- Grand Duke Nicholas Mikhailovich of Russia
- Princess Victoria Melita of Saxe-Coburg and Gotha

== Literature ==
- Jörg Nimmergut: Deutsche Orden und Ehrenzeichen bis 1945, Band I – Anhalt-Hohenzollern, Zentralstelle für wissenschaftliche Ordenskunde, München 1997, ISBN 3-00-00-1396-2
