= Heinrich von Stephan =

German postmaster (1831–1897)

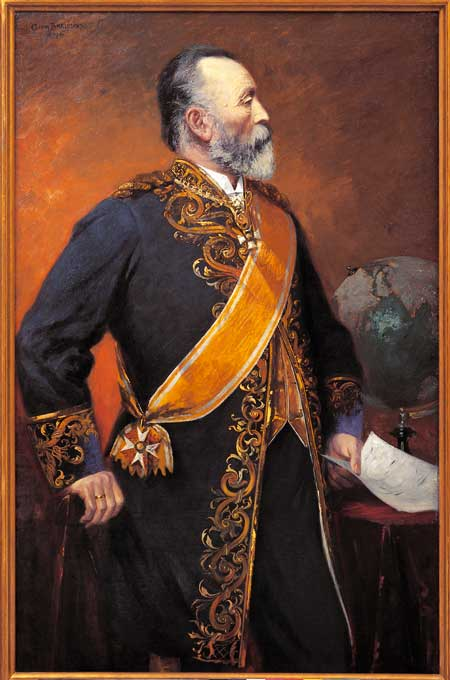
Portrait of Heinrich von Stephan

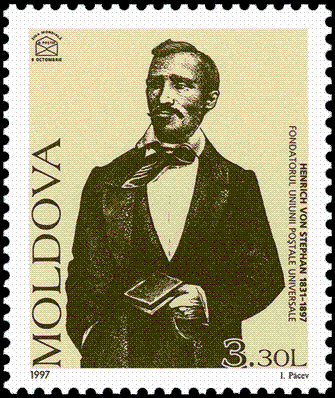
1997 Moldovan stamp commemorating von Stephan

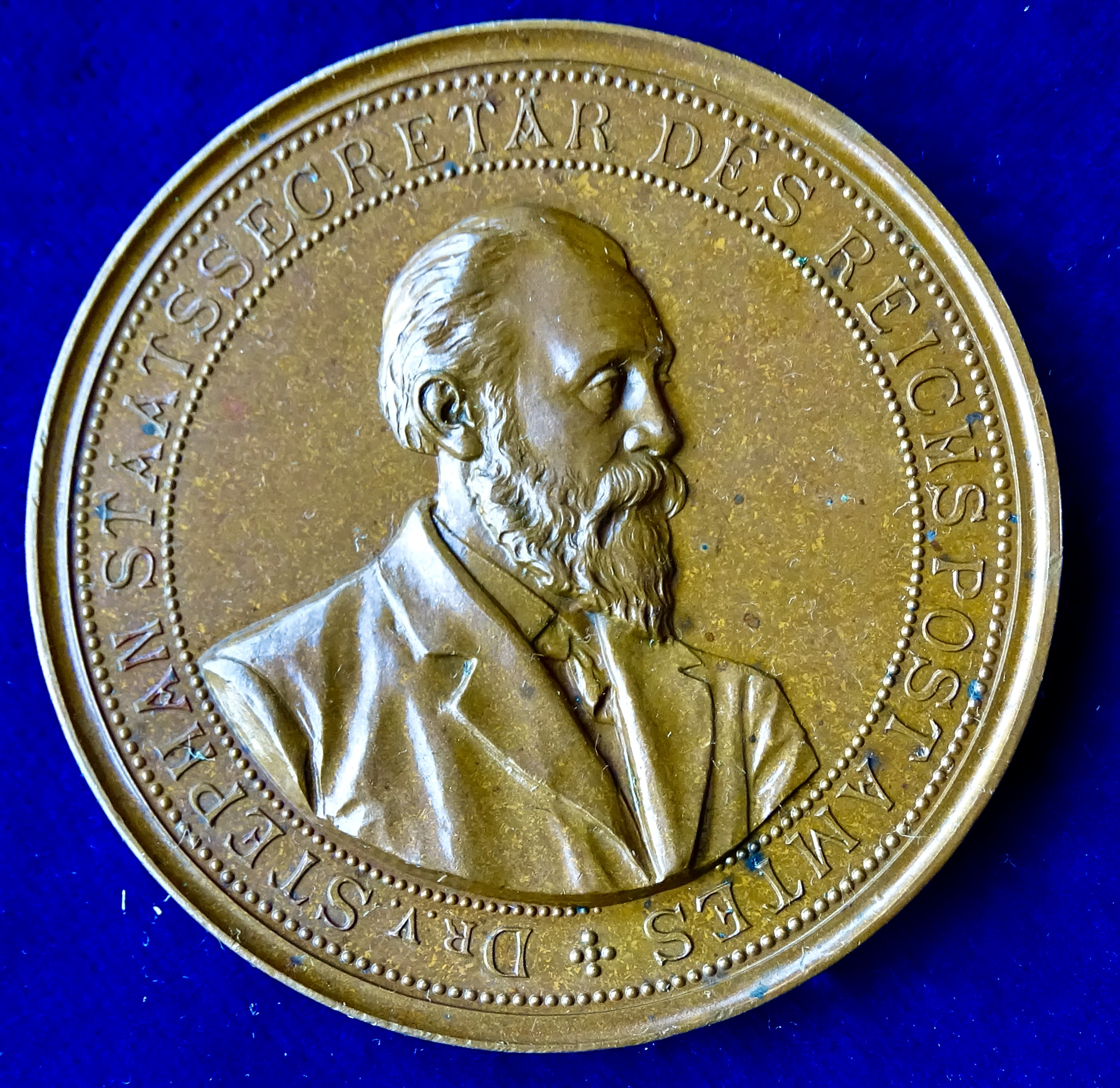
1887 portrait medal of von Stephan after his ennoblement in 1885

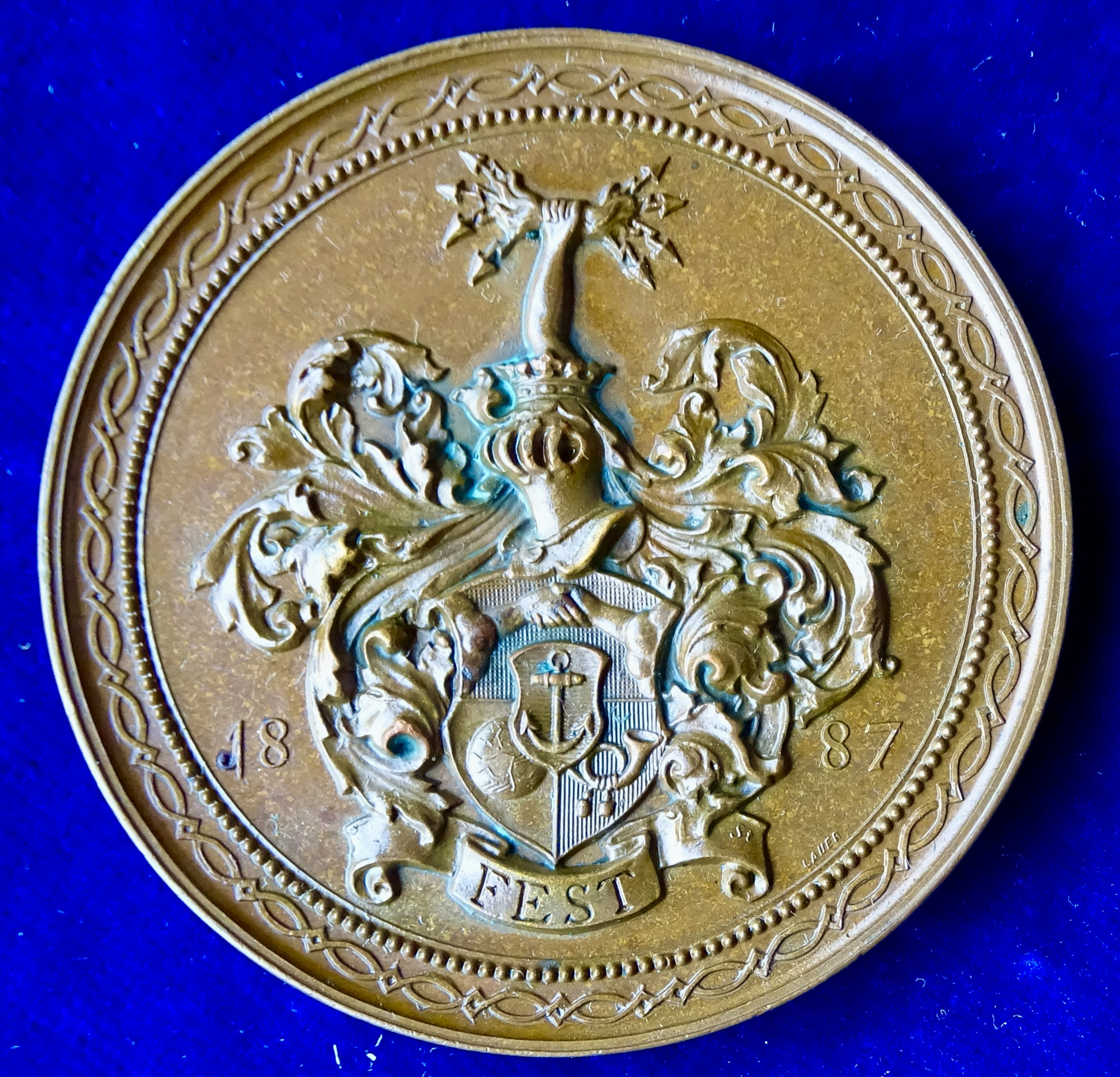
The reverse of this medal shows von Stephan's coat of arms he was awarded with

Ernst Heinrich Wilhelm von Stephan (born Heinrich Stephan, 7 January 1831 – 8 April 1897) was a general post director for the German Empire who reorganized the German postal service. He was integral in the founding of the Universal Postal Union in 1874, and in 1877 introduced the telephone to Germany.

== Biography ==
Stephan was born in Stolp (Słupsk), Pomerania, in the Kingdom of Prussia. He began his career as a local postal clerk in the service of the Prussian post in 1849. In 1866 he was put in charge by the Prussian government of federalizing the postal service that had long been privately run by the noble Thurn und Taxis family. In 1870 he was named director of postal services for the North German Confederation. Stephan's career then moved quickly up the ranks, as he was named Postmaster General of the German Empire in 1876, the Undersecretary of State in charge of the post office in 1880, and the Minister of Postal Services for Germany in 1895.

When Stephan began his work as a postal worker, Germany was divided into 17 independent states, each with its own separate policies and fees. He worked early on to establish a uniform postage rate throughout Germany, to facilitate easier mailing. His general goal of standardization and internationalization is evident in his work to combine the postal service with the telegraph service in Germany, and in his efforts to organize the International Postal Conference in Bern in 1874, in which the Universal Postal Union was established. He introduced the postcard (which he had initially suggested in 1865) to Germany after Chancellor Otto von Bismarck promoted him in 1870: the postcard came into widespread use in the subsequent Franco-Prussian War of 1870-71 as a method of communication between units in the field. He is also credited with having introduced the telephone to Germany.

Stephan died in 1897 in Berlin, having made a profound impact on the standardization of mail service worldwide. He was also actively engaged in cultivating purely Germanic terminology for the field of telecommunication and postal services. The German-speaking afterworld thus gained terms such as "Fernsprechapparat" (distance-speaking-device) for telephone, "Wertzeichen" (value-sign) for stamp, "postlagernd" (post-office-stored) for poste restante and "Anschrift" (towards-lettering, analogous to "Ansprache" or "Anrede" for addressing a person or a salutation) for address. The word creations mandated by von Stephan in the 1870s gained circulation at post offices and among its workforce, but many times the Greek or French original term was retained by German speakers. Thus at home people would say "frankieren" for putting stamps on a postcard or letter envelope (Briefumschlag) among themselves, but switch to "freimachen" (absolve from stamp-debt, thus permitting delivery) when at the post office. Or at home they would say "Telefon" in everyday speech, although the arcane official term was "Fernsprecher" (remote speaker) or Fernsprechapparat. His achievements in the field of postal services far outweigh this pedantic purism and it was his proposal to have the Siemens company manufacture telephones which led to the development of an entirely new business segment for the famous German company in 1878.

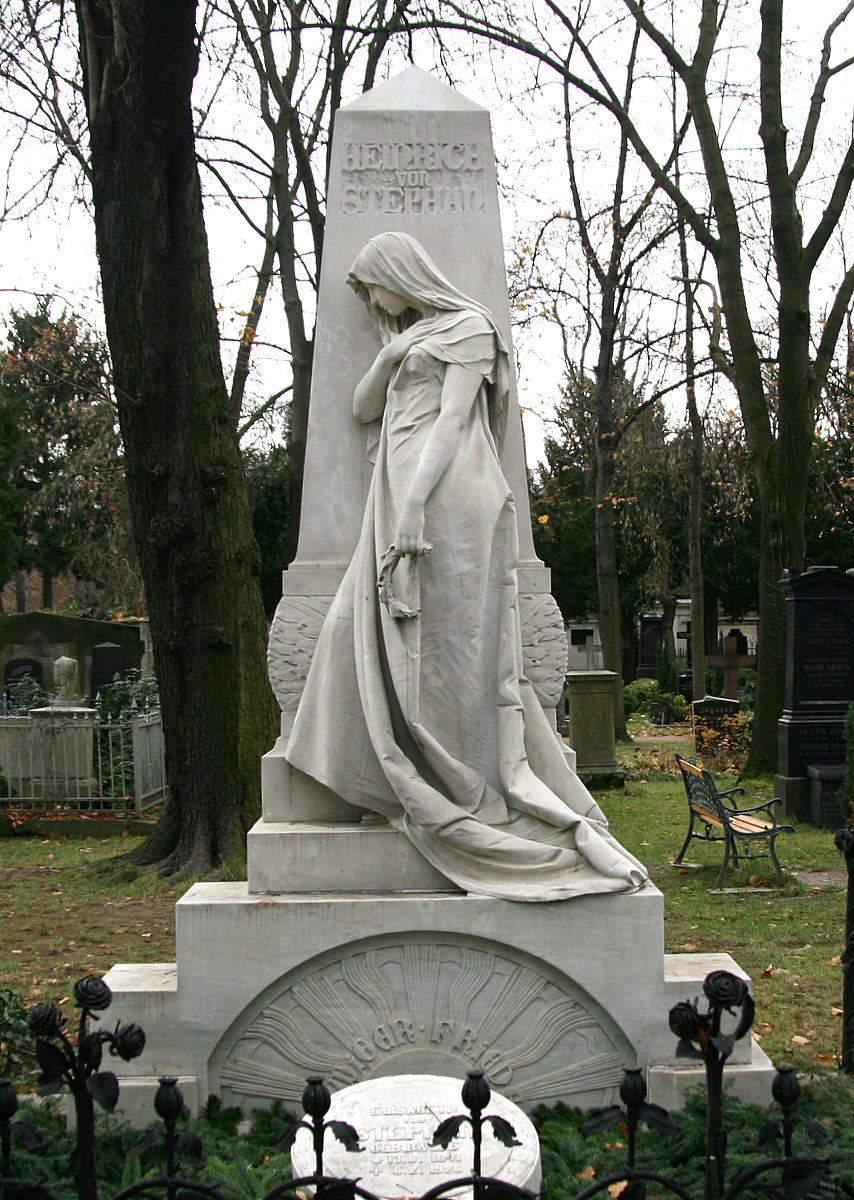
Tomb v.Stephan's in Berlin

== Orders and decorations ==
=== German honours ===
- Iron Cross 2nd Class, on Black Band (1870) (Prussia)
- Knight 2nd Class of the Order of the Red Eagle, with Oak Leaves, 1873; with Star, 26 October 1874; Grand Cross with Oak Leaves, 27 January 1894 (Prussia)
- Knight 1st Class of the Royal Order of the Crown, 18 January 1880 (Prussia)
- 1885 Ennoblement by Kaiser Wilhelm I, King of Prussia
- Commander's Cross and Star of the Royal House Order of Hohenzollern, 1 February 1892 (Prussia)
- Grand Cross of the House Order of Albert the Bear, 1881 (Anhalt)
- Grand Cross of the Order of the Zahringer Lion, 1882 (Baden)
- Grand Cross of the Order of Merit of Saint Michael, 1872 (Bavaria)
- Grand Cross of the Saxe-Ernestine House Order (Ernestine duchies)
- Grand Cross of the Order of Merit of Philip the Magnanimous, 25 August 1880 (Hesse and by Rhine)
- Honour Cross 1st Class of the House Order of Lippe (Lippe-Detmold)
- Grand Cross with Crown in Gold of the House Order of the Wendish Crown (Mecklenburg)
- Grand Cross of the House and Merit Order of Duke Peter Friedrich Ludwig, 8 April 1873 (Oldenburg)
- Grand Cross of the Order of the White Falcon, 1889 (Saxe-Weimar-Eisenach)
- Grand Cross of the Albert Order, 1883 (Saxony)
- Honour Cross 1st Class (Schwarzburg)
- Member 1st Class of the Order of Merit (Waldeck-Pyrmont)
- Grand Cross of the Friedrich Order, 1873 (Württemberg)

=== Foreign honours ===
- Knight 3rd Class of the Imperial Order of the Iron Crown, 1861 (Austrian Empire)
- Grand Cross of the Imperial Austrian Order of Franz Joseph, 1872 (Austria-Hungary)
- Grand Cross of the Austrian Imperial Order of Leopold, 1891 (Austria-Hungary)
- Commander of the Order of Leopold (Belgium)
- Commander of the Imperial Order of the Rose (Brazil)
- Grand Cross of the Order of the Dannebrog, 2 November 1874 (Denmark)
- Grand Officer of the National Order of the Legion of Honour (France)
- Commander of the Order of the Crown of Italy (Italy)
- Grand Cordon of the Order of Meiji (Japan)
- Grand Cross of the Order of the Oak Crown (Luxembourg)
- Grand Cross of the Order of the Netherlands Lion (Netherlands)
- Member 1st Class of the Order of Osmanieh (Ottoman Empire)
- Grand Cross of the Royal Military Order of Our Lord Jesus Christ (Portugal)
- Grand Cross of the Order of the Crown of Romania (Romania)
- Knight 1st Class of the Imperial Order of Saint Stanislaus (Russia)
- Grand Cross of the Most Noble Order of the Crown of Siam (Siam)
- Commander 2nd Class of the Royal Order of Isabella the Catholic (Spain)
- Commander 1st Class of the Royal Norwegian Order of Saint Olav, 6 February 1869 (Sweden-Norway)
- Commander Grand Cross of the Royal Order of the North Star, 14 January 1875 (Sweden-Norway)

== Works ==
- Geschichte der Preussischen Post von ihrem Ursprunge bis auf die Gegenwart: nach amtl. Quellen. Berlin 1859. Reprint 1987, ISBN 3-7685-3686-6.
