= Order of the Star of Brabant =

Order of merit, established on 14 June 1914 by Ernest Louis, Grand Duke of Hesse

Order of the Star of Brabant Orden "Stern von Brabant"
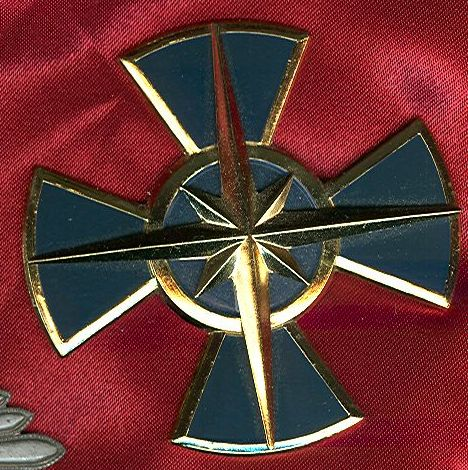
- Honour Cross 2nd Class

Awarded by The Grand Duke of Hesse
- Type: order of (civil) merit
- Established: 14 June 1914
- Motto: FÜRST VOLK NÄCHSTENLIEBE WOHLFART (prince, people, neighbourly love, charity)
- Status: obsolete
- Sovereign: Grand Duke of Hesse

Precedence
- Next (higher): Order of Philip the Magnanimous
- Next (lower): General Honor Decoration
- Ribbon bar of the order

The Order of the Star of Brabant (German: Orden "Stern von Brabant") was an order of merit, established on 14 June 1914 by Ernest Louis, Grand Duke of Hesse. The order was founded in honour of Henry I, Landgrave of Hesse, founder of the House of Hesse. After the dissolution of the Grand Duchy in 1918 it was no longer awarded.

== Classes ==
The order was established in two divisions: male and female, with the following structure:

Male division:

- Grand Cross
- Grand Commander with Turquoises
- Grand Commander 1st and 2nd Class
- Commander 1st and 2nd Class
- Honour Cross 1st and 2nd Class
- Knight Cross 1st and 2nd Class
- Silver Cross 1st and 2nd Class
- Silver Medal

Female division:

- Dame of the Honour Cross
- Dame of the 1st and 2nd Class
- Dame of the Silver Cross
- Silver Medal
