= Gustav von Senden-Bibran =

German admiral (1847–1909)

Gustav Freiherr von Senden-Bibran
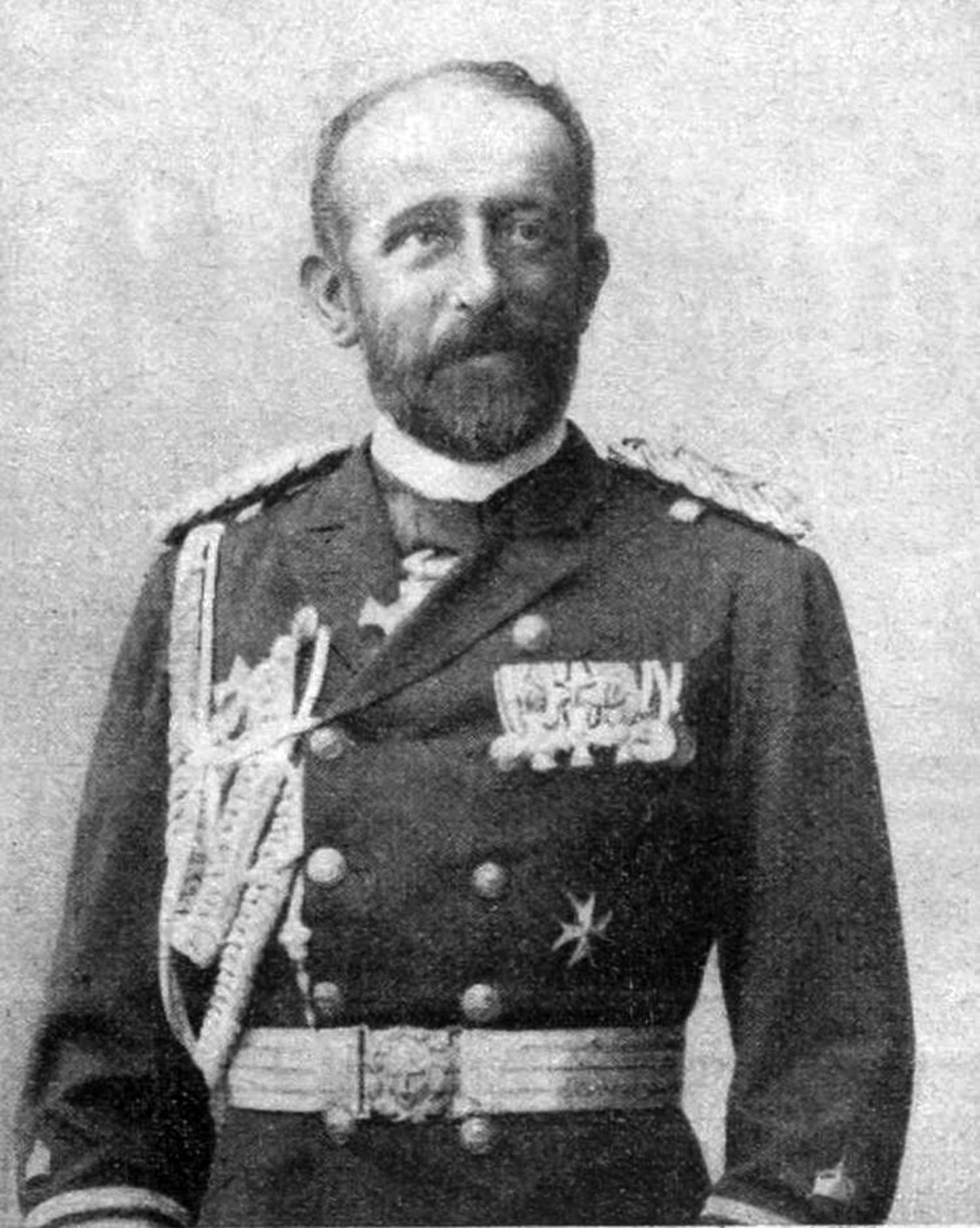
- Born: July 23, 1847; Reisicht, Schlesien
- Died: November 23, 1909 (aged 62); Berlin, Germany
- Military career
- Allegiance: German Confederation; North German Confederation; German Empire
- Branch: Reichsflotte; North German Federal Navy; Imperial German Navy
- Service years: 1862-1906
- Conflicts: Franco–Prussian War

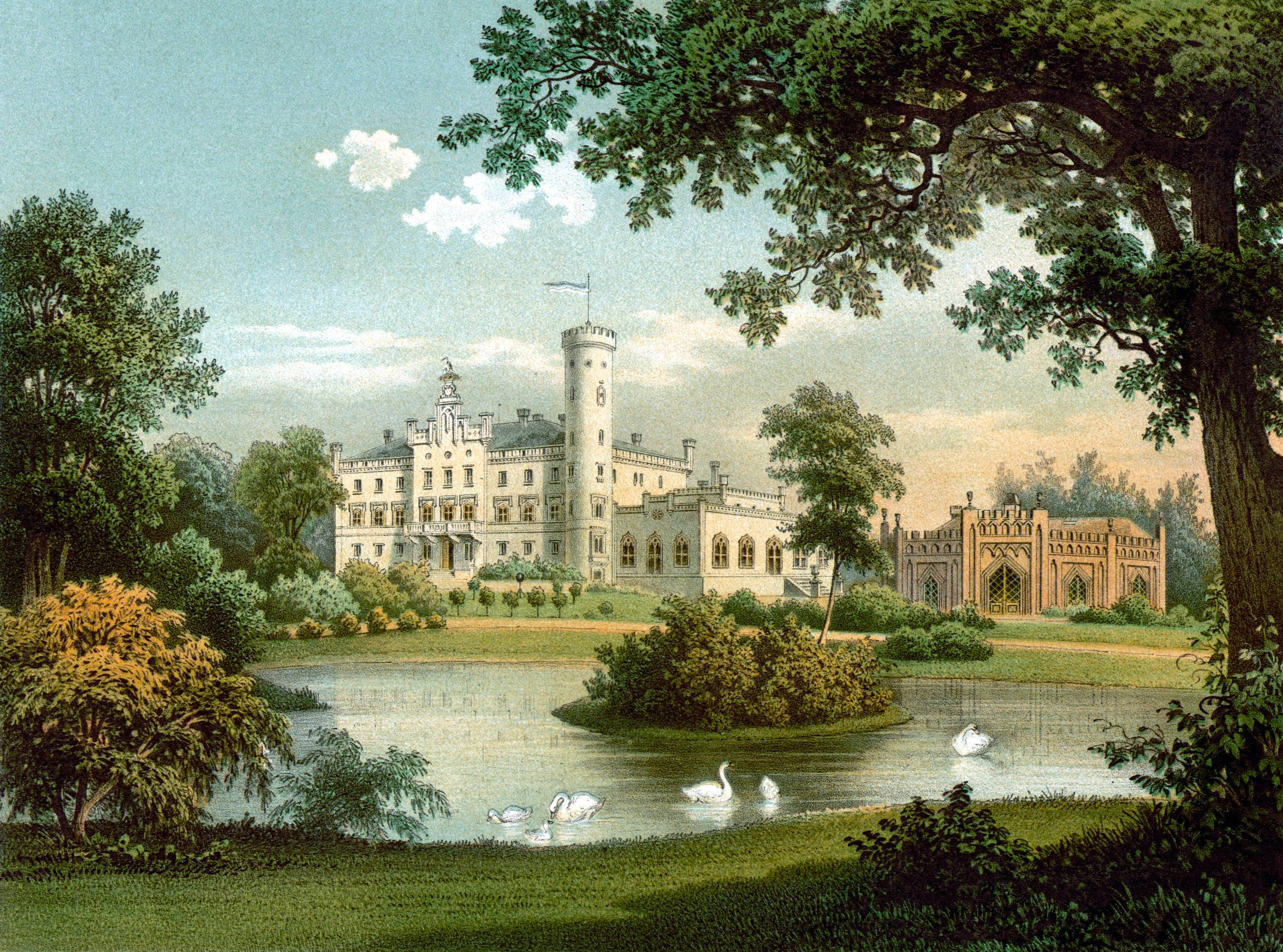
Castle Reisicht, family home of Senden-Bibran (Alexander Duncker collection).

Postcard used by Gustav in 1901 of his home Castle Reisicht, family home of Senden-Bibran

Gustav Ernst Otto Egon Freiherr (Baron) von Senden-Bibran (23 July 1847, Reisicht, Lower Silesia, Germany – 23 November 1909 in Berlin) was an admiral of the German Imperial Navy.

== Biography ==
Senden-Bibran's father was a Silesian landowner who had served in the Austro-Hungarian Cavalry. He entered the Prussian Navy at age 15, never married, and dedicated his life to building a strong German Navy.

After service in the Franco-Prussian War, from 1871 to 1874 Senden-Bibran attended the post-graduate Naval War College, the Marineakademie, along with the future admiral and colleague Otto von Diederichs.

Senden-Bibran was stationed in China, Japan and the South Pacific, the Mediterranean and Constantinople. After a cruise around the world (1881–83) he was given more important commands at home.

He became Naval Adjutant or aide to Kaiser Wilhelm II 1888, and, in 1889, Chief of the German Imperial Naval Cabinet. In both positions he was very valuable for his ability to explain technical matters in a manner that the Kaiser could understand. In 1892, he became Rear Admiral and 1899, finally, Vice Admiral.

Senden-Bibran often came into strong conflict with army and civilian leaders over his naval building plans, but he often won his goals with the support of Kaiser Wilhelm II, who "had nothing but the navy in his head." He made no secret of his goal of building a navy which would wrest world economic and political power from the British. He was accused of having "delusions of grandeur" and little knowledge of the realities of world politics and power. His period of greatest influence was in the 1890, lessening after the triumph of Tirpitz. He was something of a "naval Éminence grise" to the Kaiser, with whom he had a standing appointment to meet on Tuesday mornings, either in Berlin or Potsdam.

His power waned after the appointment of Admiral Tirpitz to the Imperial Naval Office in 1897, partly because he took the losing pro-cruiser side in the debate within the government (and for the Kaiser's ear) over whether Germany should build a cruiser fleet or a great battleship fleet.

In the controversy over where Germany should seek a base in the Far East, Senden-Bibran preferred Chusan, an island in the mouth of Hangzhou Bay.

He retired from the Naval Cabinet in 1906 in favor of Georg Alexander von Müller.

In 1903 he was made full Admiral and Adjutant General to the Kaiser. He died in 1909.

== Honours and awards ==
German orders and decorations

- Prussia:
  - Knight of the Royal Crown Order, 4th Class, 18 November 1879; 2nd Class, 1 January 1891; with Star, 27 January 1897; 1st Class
  - Knight of Honour of the Johanniter Order, 18 February 1880; Knight of Justice
  - Knight of the Red Eagle, 4th Class, 18 January 1885; 2nd Class with Oak Leaves and Crown, 27 January 1894; Grand Cross with Swords
  - Commander's Cross of the Royal House Order of Hohenzollern, with Star, 15 June 1898
  - Knight of the Black Eagle, with Collar
  - Service Award Cross
- Baden: Commander of the Zähringer Lion, 1st Class with Star, 1895
- Bavaria: Grand Commander of the Military Merit Order
- Hesse and by Rhine: Grand Cross of the Merit Order of Philip the Magnanimous, with Crown, 6 June 1905
- (Principality of Schaumburg-Lippe) Lippe: Cross of Honour of the House Order of Lippe, 1st Class
- Mecklenburg:
  - Grand Cross of the Wendish Crown, with Golden Crown
  - Grand Cross of the Griffon
- Oldenburg: Grand Cross of the Order of Duke Peter Friedrich Ludwig, with Golden Crown
- Saxe-Weimar-Eisenach: Grand Cross of the White Falcon
- Saxony: Grand Cross of the Albert Order
- Württemberg:
  - Commander of the Württemberg Crown, 1892
  - Grand Cross of the Friedrich Order

Foreign orders and decorations

- (Austrian Empire) (Kingdom of Hungary) Austria-Hungary:
  - Commander of the Imperial Order of Leopold, 1889
  - Grand Cross of the Order of Franz Joseph, 1895
  - Knight of the Iron Crown, 1st Class, 1900
- Belgium: Grand Officer of the Order of Leopold
- Denmark: Grand Cross of the Dannebrog, 3 April 1903
- France: Grand Officer of the Legion of Honour
- Greece: Grand Cross of the Redeemer
- Italy:
  - Grand Cross of Saints Maurice and Lazarus
  - Grand Cross of the Crown of Italy
- Japan: Order of the Rising Sun, 3rd Class
- Netherlands: Commander of the Netherlands Lion
- Ottoman Empire:
  - Order of Osmanieh, 2nd Class
  - Order of the Medjidie, 1st Class
  - Gold and Silver Imtiyaz Medals
- Portugal: Grand Cross of the Royal Military Order of Our Lord Jesus Christ
- Romania: Commander of the Star of Romania
- Russia: Knight of the White Eagle
- Spain: Grand Cross of Naval Merit
- Sweden-Norway:
  - Commander of St. Olav, 1st Class, 2 July 1890
  - Commander Grand Cross of the Sword, 1895
- United Kingdom: Honorary Grand Cross of the Royal Victorian Order, 23 November 1899

== Sources ==
- The Entourage of Kaiser Wilhelm II, 1888–1918 by Isabel V. Hull; Cambridge University Press, 2004 ISBN 052153321X
- Gottschall, Terrel D.: "By Order of the Kaiser. Otto Von Diederichs and the Rise of the Imperial German Navy, 1865-1902", Naval Institute Press, Annapolis, 2003. ISBN 1-55750-309-5
- The Kaiser and His Court: Wilhelm II and the Government of Germany by John C. G. Röhl; Translated byTerence F. Cole, Cambridge University Press; 288 pages.
- By order of the Kaiser: Otto von Diederichs and the rise of the Imperial German Navy, 1865–1902 by Terrell D. Gottschall; Institute Press, 2003, 337 pages, p. 154.
- Hildebrand, Hans; Henriot, Ernest (1990). P — Z (in German). Vol. 3. Osnabrück: Biblio-Verl. pp. 329–330. ISBN 3764814993.
