= Georg Alexander von Müller =

German admiral

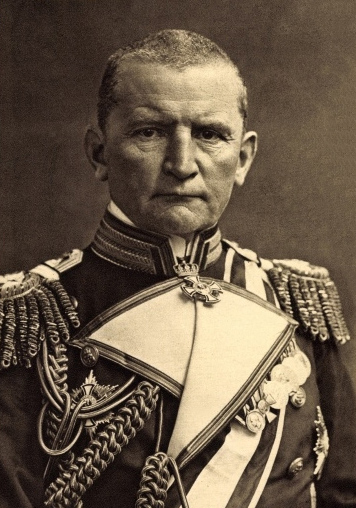
- Born: 24 March 1854; Chemnitz, Kingdom of Saxony
- Died: 18 April 1940 (aged 86) Hangelsberg
- Allegiance: German Empire
- Branch: Imperial German Navy
- Service years: 1871–1919
- Rank: Admiral
- Commands: Chief of the German Imperial Naval Cabinet
- Conflicts: World War I
- Awards: Pour le Mérite

Georg Alexander von Müller (24 March 1854 – 18 April 1940) was an Admiral of the Imperial German Navy and a close friend of the Kaiser in the run up to the First World War.

== Career ==
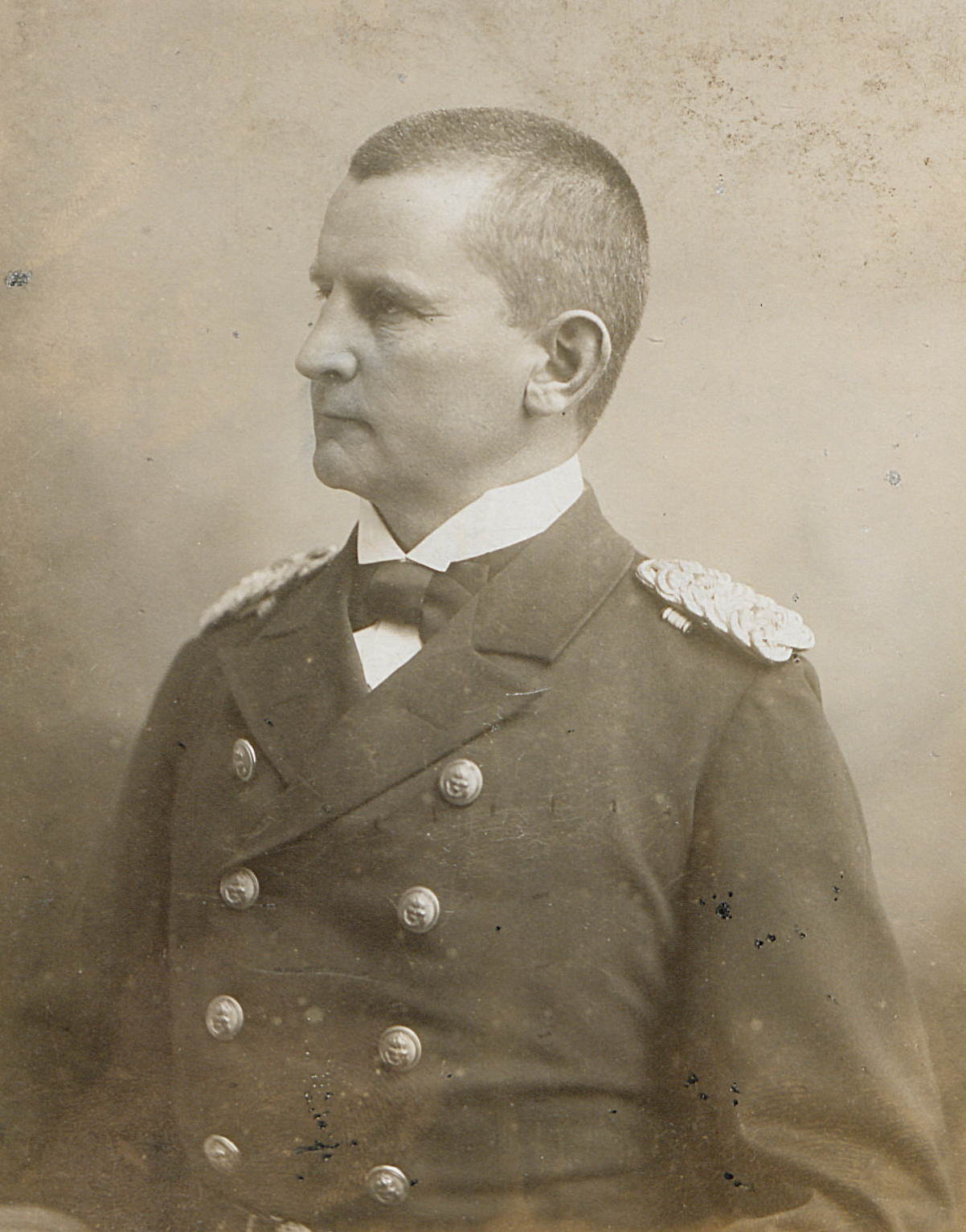
Müller in 1916

Müller grew up in Sweden, where his father worked as a professor of agriculture.

He joined the Imperial Navy in 1871 and served in many different positions, including commander of the gunboat Iltis in East Asia from 1891 to 1892, and then officer on the staff of Prince Heinrich of Prussia. He was Adjutant from 1904 to Kaiser Wilhelm II. He was named to the Prussian nobility (Adelstitel) in 1900. In 1906, he succeeded Gustav von Senden-Bibran as Chief of the German Imperial Naval Cabinet and served until the end of the German Empire in 1918. As chief of the Naval Cabinet, he dealt with not only with technical issues but also the Court and many politicians. By the start of the First World War, he had become an ally of Chancellor Theobald von Bethmann Hollweg in his attempts to control and moderate the Kaiser's actions.

As one of the Kaiser's principal military decisionmakers before to the First World War, he was mostly pro-war. During the October 1911 Second Moroccan Crisis, he told the Kaiser that "there are worse things than war". He saw a coming racial war in which the German race must be upheld against the Slavic and Roman races.

He was serving in that position at the start of the First World War. During the Kiel Regatta in June 1914, he was responsible for delivering news of the assassination of Archduke Franz Ferdinand to the Kaiser. On 30 August, the Kaiser named his brother Grossadmiral Prince Heinrich of Prussia as commander of the Baltic Sea Squadron (Oberfelshaber der Ostseestreikräfte). Müller advised against that as the Prince had held the largely-ceremonial post of Navy Inspector General and was not really qualified. The Kaiser agreed but saw the Baltic theatre as not critical and intended to give his brother a capable staff. Only a few days later, Müller objected the mining by Heinrich's forces on 5 August of an area of Danish territorial waters, thus threatening Danish neutrality. Finally, after it was reported that Heinrich had lost his nerve at the prospect of battle with the Russians, other arrangements were made on 9 October 1914 to keep him from commanding any important actions.

Once war was declared with the United Kingdom in the early days of August 1914, Müller agreed with the Kaiser for only a limited guerrilla war against Britain, with no use of capital ships to allow a negotiated peace once France and Russia had been defeated.

As the war progressed and the Kaiser withdrew into a sheltered life at Imperial Headquarters in an atmosphere of "fear of the world and flight from reality", Müller worked with Generaloberst Moriz von Lyncker at great lengths to persuade the Kaiser to spend more time on the business of the government in Berlin. Lyncker and Müller had long realised Wilhelm II's lack of effective leadership, but hoped to protect the institution of the monarchy from a revolution in Germany and to prevent reforms that would turn Germany into a constitutional monarchy because Germany's greatness rested on its semi-absolutist constitution and royal prerogative. For them, the Kaiser had to fulfill his symbolic purpose by occasional appearances in public but could not be trusted with real responsibility for decisionmaking. Finally, by October 1918, Müller had decided that the Kaiser should abdicate to save the monarchy.

In January 1917, Müller acquiesced to the decision for the implementation of unrestricted U-boat warfare on the basis of Admiral Henning von Holtzendorff's memorandum during Pless conference on 9 January 1917.

In Müller's memoirs, he dealt intensively with the personality of Wilhelm II.

== Decorations and awards ==
He received the following orders and decorations:

- Order of the Black Eagle (Prussia) 01.08.1915
- Grand Cross of the Order of the Red Eagle with oak leaves and Crown (Prussia)
- Order of the Crown, 1st class (Prussia)
- Grand Commander of the Royal House Order of Hohenzollern with Swords
- Iron Cross of 1914, 1st and 2nd class
- Service Award (Prussian)
- Lifesaving Medal, on sash
- Cross of Merit, First Class of the Princely House Order of Hohenzollern
- Grand Cross of the Order of Berthold I with Swords (Baden)
- Grand Cross of the Order of the Zähringer Lion (Baden)
- Grand Cross of the Military Merit Order with Crown and Swords (Bavaria)
- Commander Second Class of the Order of Henry the Lion (Brunswick)
- Hanseatic Cross of Hamburg
- Grand Cross of the Order of Philip of Hesse
- Cross of Merit, First Class of the House Order of the Honour Cross (Lippe)
- War Merit Cross (Lippe)
- Grand Commander of the Order of the Griffon (Mecklenburg)
- Honorary Grand Cross of the House and Merit Order of Peter Frederick Louis (Oldenburg)
- Grand Cross of the Albert Order with golden star and Swords
- Cross for Faithful Service (Schaumburg-Lippe)
- Grand Cross of the Order of the Crown with Swords (Württemberg)
- Grand Cross of the Friedrich Order with Crown
- Honorary Grand Cross of the Royal Victorian Order (United Kingdom)
- Grand Cordon of the Order of the Rising Sun (Japan)
- Grand Cordon of the Order of Meiji (Japan)
- Commander Grand Cross of the Order of the Sword (Sweden)
- Knight of the Order of Vasa, 1st Class (Sweden)

== Works ==
The Kaiser and His Court: The Diaries, Note Books and Letters of Admiral Georg Alexander Von Müller, Chief of the Naval Cabinet, 1914–1918; MacDonald & Co (1961).

== Sources ==
- Walter Görlitz (Hrsg): Der Kaiser ... Aufzeichnungen des Chefs des Marinekabinetts Admiral Georg Alexander v. Müller über die Ära Wilhelms II. Göttingen 1965
