= Dietrich von Hülsen-Haeseler =

Imperial German general (1852–1908)

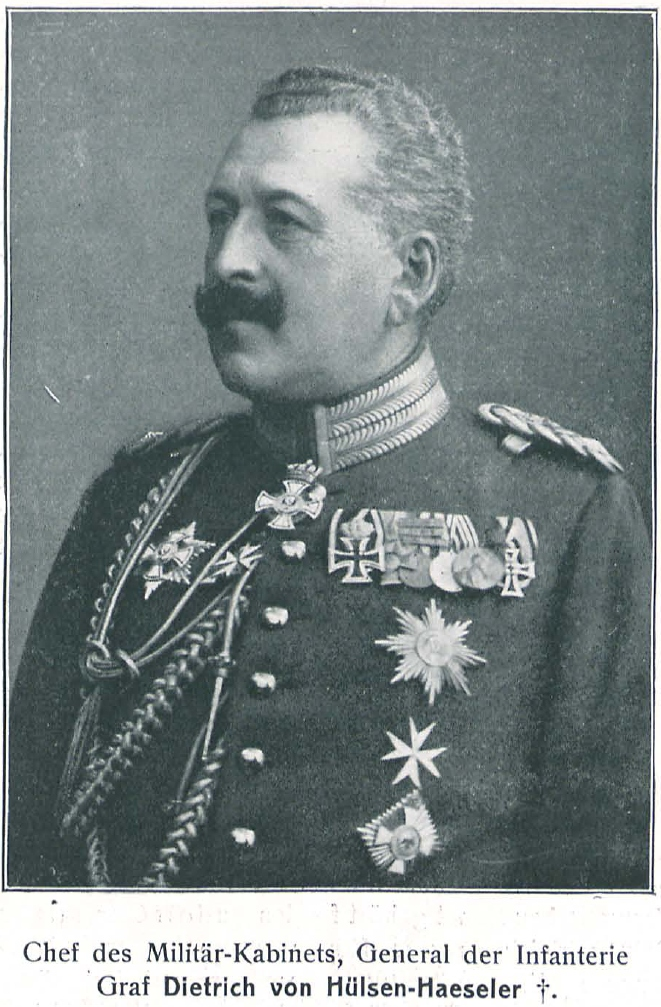

Dietrich Graf von Hülsen-Haeseler (13 February 1852 – 14 November 1908) was an infantry general of the German Empire.

He attended the War College and was attached to the German General Staff in 1882. In 1889 he was made aide de camp to Kaiser Wilhelm II, whom he had known since boyhood.

In 1894, von Hülsen-Haeseler was named military attaché at the German embassy in Vienna. In 1897, now a colonel, he returned to Berlin as commander of a guards regiment. In 1899 he was promoted to major general, made chief of general staff in the Guards Corps, and then given command of the 2nd Guards Infantry Brigade.

From May 1901 until his death in November 1908, von Hülsen-Haeseler served as Chief of the German Imperial Military Cabinet, during which time he rose to General of Infantry.

== Death ==
On 14 November 1908, Dietrich Graf von Hülsen-Haeseler died of a heart attack while on a hunting trip in honor of the Kaiser. The hunting party was staying at Donaueschingen Castle in Donaueschingen, Baden; the Black Forest country estate of Prince Max von Fürstenberg. During a formal evening function, von Hülsen-Haeseler appeared dressed in the pink tutu and rose wreath of a ballerina, dancing for the Kaiser and his assembled guests. The performance included pirouettes, jumps, capers and flirtatious kisses to the audience. Apparently exhausted by his exertions, the general bowed, collapsed and was pronounced dead after hasty medical attention. The circumstances were covered up by the officer corps so as not to further inflame public pressure over the homosexually themed Harden–Eulenburg affair. Ironically, it was von Hülsen-Haeseler who had organized the cover-up of that scandal.

== Honours and awards ==
German honours

- Prussia:
  - Iron Cross (1870), 2nd Class
  - Knight of the Crown Order, 2nd Class, 1896; with Star, 19 September 1901; 1st Class
  - Grand Cross of the Red Eagle, with Crown, Oak Leaves and Swords on Ring
  - Commander's Star of the Royal House Order of Hohenzollern
  - Knight of Justice of the Johanniter Order
  - Service Award Cross
- Anhalt: Grand Cross of the Order of Albert the Bear, with Crown
- Baden:
  - Grand Cross of the Order of Berthold the First
  - Grand Cross of the Zähringer Lion, with Oak Leaves
- Bavaria:
  - Grand Cross of the Merit Order of St. Michael, 1906
  - Grand Cross of the Military Merit Order
- Brunswick: Grand Cross of the Order of Henry the Lion, 1902
- (Saxe-Coburg and Gotha) (Duchy of Saxe-Altenburg) (Saxe-Meiningen) Ernestine duchies: Grand Cross of the Saxe-Ernestine House Order
- Hesse and by Rhine: Grand Cross of the Merit Order of Philip the Magnanimous, 2 January 1902; with Crown
- Hohenzollern: Cross of Honour of the Princely House Order of Hohenzollern, 1st Class
- Lippe-Detmold: Cross of Honour of the House Order of Lippe, 2nd Class
- Oldenburg: Grand Cross of Honour of the Order of Duke Peter Friedrich Ludwig, with Collar and Golden Crown
- Mecklenburg:
  - Grand Cross of the Wendish Crown, with Golden Crown
  - Grand Cross of the Griffon
- Saxe-Weimar-Eisenach: Grand Cross of the White Falcon
- Saxony: Officer of the Albert Order, 1890; Grand Cross with Golden Star
- Schaumburg-Lippe: Cross of Honour of the House Order of Schaumburg-Lippe, 1st Class
- Schwarzburg: Princely Schwarzburg Cross of Honour, 1st Class with Crown
- Waldeck and Pyrmont: Cross of Merit, 1st Class
- Württemberg:
  - Commander of the Württemberg Crown, with Star, 1902; Grand Cross, ca. 1907
  - Grand Cross of the Friedrich Order, 1903

Foreign honours

- (Austrian Empire) (Kingdom of Hungary) Austria-Hungary:
  - Knight of the Iron Crown, 2nd Class, 1890
  - Grand Cross of the Order of Franz Joseph, 1900
  - Grand Cross of the Imperial Order of Leopold, 1906
- Belgium: Grand Cordon of the Order of Leopold
- Bulgaria: Grand Cross of St. Alexander
- Denmark: Grand Cross of the Dannebrog, 3 April 1903
- Greece: Grand Cross of the Redeemer
- Italy:
  - Grand Cross of Saints Maurice and Lazarus
  - Grand Cross of the Crown of Italy
- Montenegro: Grand Cross of the Order of Prince Danilo I
- Netherlands:
  - Knight of the Netherlands Lion
  - Grand Cross of the Order of Orange-Nassau
- Norway: Grand Cross of St. Olav, 15 December 1906
- Ottoman Empire:
  - Order of Osmanieh, 2nd Class
  - Order of the Medjidie, 1st Class
  - Gold and Silver Imtiyaz Medals
- Persia: Order of the Lion and the Sun, 1st Class in Diamonds
- Portugal: Grand Cross of the Royal Military Order of Our Lord Jesus Christ
- Romania:
  - Commander of the Star of Romania
  - Grand Cross of the Crown of Romania
- Russia:
  - Knight of St. Alexander Nevsky
  - Knight of St. Anna, 2nd Class in Diamonds
  - Knight of St. Stanislaus, 3rd Class with Swords
- Siam: Grand Cross of the White Elephant
- Spain: Grand Cross of Military Merit
- Sweden: Commander Grand Cross of the Sword, 16 February 1904; with Collar, 6 June 1908
- United Kingdom: Honorary Grand Cross of the Royal Victorian Order, 12 November 1907
