= Order of the Griffon (Mecklenburg) =

Order of the Griffon Greifenorden
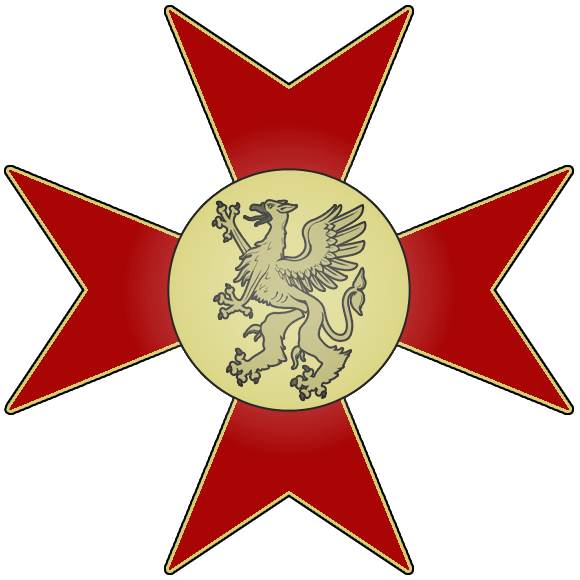
- Insignia of the order
- Type: State Order
- Country: Mecklenburg-Schwerin and Mecklenburg-Strelitz
- Royal house: House of Mecklenburg
- Motto: ALTIOR ADVERSIS (Against All Odds)
- Status: No longer awarded
- Grand Masters: Grand Dukes of Mecklenburg-Schwerin and Mecklenburg-Strelitz

Precedence
- Next (lower): House Order of the Wendish Crown
- Ribbon of the order

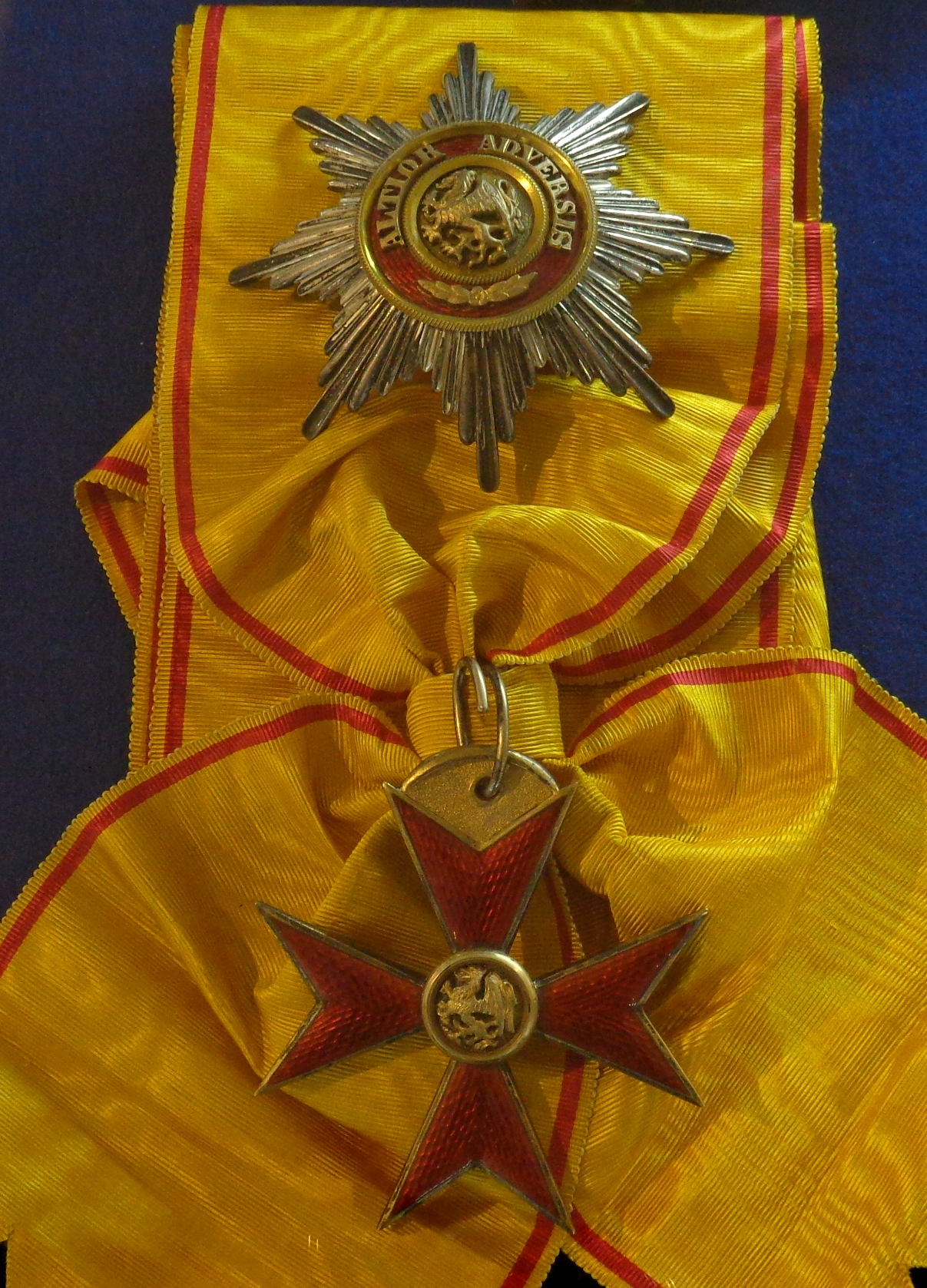
Grand Cross of the Order.

The Order of the Griffon (German: Greifenorden) was a State Order of the Grand Duchy of Mecklenburg-Schwerin. Established on 15 September 1884, it was created to honour benevolence and outstanding service to the public. In August 1904, the Order of the Griffon was extended to citizens of the Grand Duchy of Mecklenburg-Strelitz, with the rulers of the two grand duchies serving jointly as the Grand Masters of the order.

== Classes ==
The Order of the Griffon was awarded in three classes with six grades:

First class

- Grand Cross

Second class

- Grand Commander's Cross
- Commander's Cross
- Officer's Cross or Honour Cross

Third class

- Knight's Cross with Crown
- Knight's Cross

== Appearance ==
The badge of the order was a red enameled maltese cross, outlined in gold. On the centre of the cross is a disc with a golden griffon surrounded by a gold ring. The Grand Cross badge was worn at the left hip, hanging from a 4 in wide sash that goes over the right shoulder. The Grand Commander's and Commander's Cross badges were worn suspended from the neck on a narrower ribbon. These badges were slightly smaller than the Grand Cross badge, but otherwise identical in appearance. The Honour Cross was smaller still and did not have the gold ring surrounding the griffon in the centre. Finally, the two Knight's Crosses were slightly smaller than the Commander's Cross and worn suspended from a ribbon worn on the left chest.

The star of the order was worn by recipients of the Grand Cross and Grand Commander's Cross on the left chest. The Grand Cross star was a silver 8-armed star with arms of equal length. In the centre of the star is a disc bearing a gold griffon. The disc is surrounded by red enamel with the motto ALTIOR ADVERSIS (Against All Odds), in gold lettering and bordered in gold. The Grand Commander's Cross star was smaller silver 8-armed star with arms alternating between long and short length.

The ribbon of the order was yellow with red edges.

== Recipients ==
- Duke Adolf Friedrich of Mecklenburg
- Adolphus Frederick VI, Grand Duke of Mecklenburg-Strelitz
- Adolphus Frederick V, Grand Duke of Mecklenburg-Strelitz
- Grand Duke Alexander Mikhailovich of Russia
- Joachim von Amsberg (general)
- Aoki Shūzō
- Prince Axel of Denmark
- Eduard von Below
- Theobald von Bethmann Hollweg
- Moritz von Bissing
- Herbert von Böckmann
- Borwin, Duke of Mecklenburg
- Walther Bronsart von Schellendorff
- Bernhard von Bülow
- Eduard von Capelle
- Christian X of Denmark
- Frederick Francis III, Grand Duke of Mecklenburg-Schwerin
- Frederick Francis IV, Grand Duke of Mecklenburg-Schwerin
- Hans Heinrich XV, Prince of Pless
- Heinrich von Gossler
- Karl von Graffen
- Duke Henry of Mecklenburg-Schwerin
- Ernst von Hoeppner
- Eberhard von Hofacker
- Adolf Wild von Hohenborn
- Henning von Holtzendorff
- Dietrich von Hülsen-Haeseler
- Oskar von Hutier
- Duke John Albert of Mecklenburg
- Ferdinand Jühlke
- Prince Kitashirakawa Yoshihisa
- Hans von Koester
- Leopold II of Belgium
- Alexander von Linsingen
- Louis Ferdinand, Prince of Prussia
- August von Mackensen
- Helmuth von Moltke the Younger
- Curt von Morgen
- Georg Alexander von Müller
- Duke Paul Frederick of Mecklenburg (1882–1904)
- Duke Paul Frederick of Mecklenburg
- Karl von Plettenberg
- Hugo von Pohl
- Frederick Ponsonby, 1st Baron Sysonby
- Reinhard Scheer
- Eberhard Graf von Schmettow
- Gustav von Senden-Bibran
- Grand Duke Sergei Mikhailovich of Russia
- Hermann von Stengel
- Hermann von Strantz
- Otto von Stülpnagel
- Alfred von Tirpitz
- Adolf von Trotha
- Karl von Wedel
- Arthur Zimmermann

== Sources ==
- Ludvigsen, Eric (1990). The Griffon Order of the Mecklenburg Grand Duchies – An Outline (PDF). Orders and Medals Society of America.
