= August von Heeringen =

- Born: 26 November 1855; Kassel, Electorate of Hesse, German Confederation
- Died: 29 September 1927 (aged 71); Berlin-Grunewald, German Reich
- Spouse: ∞ 1889 Helene Aurelie Anna Wilhelmine Luise Gräfin von Unruh (b. 31 October 1864 in Berlin)
- Relatives: Josias von Heeringen (brother)
- Military career
- Allegiance: German Empire
- Branch: Imperial German Navy
- Service years: 1872–1914
- Rank: Admiral
- Commands: Marinestation der Nordsee
- Awards: Order of the Red Eagle 1st class with oak leaves

Carl August Amon von Heeringen (26 November 1855 – 29 September 1927) was a Prussian admiral of the German Empire. He headed the Imperial Navy News Office (Nachrichtenbureau des Reichsmarineamts) and served as the Chief of the German Naval General Staff (Admiralstab) 12 March 1911 – 31 March 1913, and was present at the famous War Council of 8 December 1912.

== Early life ==
Heeringen was born in Kassel in the Electorate of Hesse. He was the son of Josias von Heeringen (1809–1885) and his wife Ehefrau Karoline von Starkloff (1817–1871). His elder brother Josias von Heeringen was a general.

== Career ==
He worked with leaders of the German Empire such as Kaiser Wilhelm II, and admirals Alfred von Tirpitz, Georg Alexander von Müller, Gustav von Senden-Bibran, and Friedrich von Hollmann to build a strong German navy. He saw it as a means to secure Germany's position on the world stage. Also, he saw a great national navy as a unifying force for an empire still divided into various kingdoms.

At the Navy News Office he worked with and attempted to direct pressure groups such as the Pan-German League and the Colonial Society (Deutsche Kolonialgesellschaft), and the Navy League (Germany) (Flottenverein).

In March 1896, at the request of Admiral Otto von Diederichs, Chief of Staff of the Naval High Command he produced the first naval plans for a war against Britain, which emphasized rapid mobilization and preemptive strikes. He had become something of a follower of Tirpitz, and, when the latter took over the German Imperial Naval Office (Reichsmarineamtin) in 1897, he followed to head up the Central Division (Zentralabteilung).

At the Kaiser's request in January 1913, he was involved in efforts to plan a coordinated wartime use of the Italian and Austrian fleets in the Mediterranean to prevent French troop movements from North Africa.
