= Pless conference =

WWI German military strategy conference

The Pless conference was a conference held at the castle of Prince Pless located in the Duchy of Pless on January 8, 1917. The conference involved the German army and navy arguing which division should take command of German activity in World War I. The German navy under Admiral Holtzendorff desired unrestricted submarine warfare to shut down the North Atlantic trade supplying Britain with food and munitions. The navy felt that it could starve Britain within six months to a year, before American troops could arrive on the Western Front and change the war. A memo was drafted by Admiral Holtzendorff in December 1916 before the Pless Conference, that argued for unrestricted submarine warfare. Pressure mounted on Kaiser Wilhelm II to agree with the memo, which he had previously disagreed with due to his commitment to a policy of moderation.

The Kaiser relented following the Allied rejection of the German offer for peace in Dec 1916 and agreed with the memo. The Kaiser announced invitations to both the army and navy for the conference to announce his decision. Chancellor Theobald von Bethmann Hollweg resigned due to his displeasure with the use of unrestricted sub warfare. Unconditional submarine warfare was then set to begin Jan. 31 attacking all ships within the British coastal zone and Atlantic.

== Text of the Holtzendorff Memo ==
The Chief of the Admiralty Staff of the Navy Berlin, 22 December 1916

B 35 840 I

To the

Royal Field-Marshal

Chief of the General Staff of the Army

His Excellency v. Beneckendorff und v. Hindenburg.

Great Headquarters

Most Secret!

I have the honour to respectfully submit to your Excellency in the attachment a memorandum on the necessity for the commencement an unrestricted campaign of submarine warfare at the earliest opportunity. The memorandum is essentially a continuation of the memorandum Ref. No. 22 247 I of 27 August 1916: The Merchant Tonnage Issue and the Supply of England in 1916, which has previously been submitted to your Excellency.

Based on the detailed information attached to this memorandum, I would like to ask your Excellency to kindly follow the line of argument laid out below, and I hope to achieve agreement that it is absolutely necessary to increase our measures against England as soon as possible to the very limit of our abilities in order to exploit the favourable situation and to obtain a swift victory.

I.

The war requires a decision before autumn 1917, lest it should end in the mutual exhaustion of all parties and thus in a disaster for us. Of our enemies, Italy and France are already so severely weakened in their economic foundations that they are kept in the fight only through England's energy and resources. If we succeed to break England's backbone, the war will immediately be decided in our favour. England's backbone is the merchant tonnage, which delivers essential imports for their survival and for the military industry of the British islands and which ensures the [kingdom's] ability to pay for its imports from abroad.

II.

The current situation in respect to the merchant tonnage has already been mentioned in the memorandum of 27 August and is laid out in further detail in the attachment. In all brevity the situation is as follows: The [shipping] rates have reached outrageous levels, often as much as ten times as much [as in peacetime] for many important goods. We know with certainty from a variety of sources that merchant tonnage is lacking everywhere.

The current English merchant tonnage can safely be assumed to be in the order of 20 million gross register tons. 8.6 million tons of these are requisitioned for military purposes, and 1/2 million is employed in coastal trade. Approximately 1 million [tons] are undergoing repairs or are otherwise temporarily unavailable. Approximately 2 million tons are sailing for other allies, which leaves about 8 million tons of English merchant tonnage to provide for the supply of England. An analysis of statistical figures of ship movements in British ports suggests an even lower figure. In the months of July - September 1916 only 6 3/4 million tons were employed in the trade with England. In addition to that, other tonnage sailing in the trade with England can be assumed to amount to around 900,000 tons of enemy - non-English - and approximately 3 million tons of neutral tonnage. Hence, no more than 10 3/4 million GRT are at the disposal for the supply of England.

III.

If the achievements in our battle against merchant tonnage have been encouraging thus far, then the exceptionally poor world harvest of grain, including feed grain, this year provides us with a unique opportunity, which nobody could responsibly reject. Both North America and Canada will probably cease their grain exports to England in February. Then that country will have to draw its grain supplies from the more distant Argentina, but since Argentina will only be able to deliver very limited quantities, because of the poor harvest, England will have to turn to India and mostly Australia. In the attachment it is explained in detail how such an increase in the length of the grain routes will require an extra 720,000 tons of tonnage for the grain shipments alone. In practice, the implications will be that, until August 1917, 3/4 million tons of the available 10 3/4 million tons will have to be employed for a service, which had hitherto not been required.

IV.

Under such favourable circumstances an energetic blow conducted with all force against English merchant tonnage will promise a certain success in a way that I have to reiterate and emphasize my statements made on 27 August 1916 that "our clearly defined strategic objective is to force a decision in our favour through the destruction of [enemy] sea transport capacity" and also that "from a military point of view it would be irresponsible not to make use of the submarine weapon now." As things stand at the moment, I cannot vouch that a campaign of unrestricted submarine warfare will force England to make peace within five months time. This reservation needs to be made in respect to the unrestricted submarine warfare only. Of the currently conducted submarine warfare under cruiser a decisive result cannot be expected, regardless of the circumstances, even if all armed merchantmen are designated as legitimate targets.

V.

Based on a monthly rate of destruction of 600,000 tons of shipping through a campaign of unrestricted submarine warfare, as pointed out previously, and on the well grounded expectation, elaborated upon in the attachment, that at least two fifths of the neutral tonnage sailing in the trade with England will be deterred by such a campaign, it stands to reason that the current volume English sea borne trade will be reduced by 39% within five months. This would not be bearable for England, neither in view of her future position after the war, nor in view of her ability to continue the war effort. Already, the country is at the verge of a food crisis, which will soon compel it to attempt to undertake the same food rationing measures, which we, as a blockaded country, have been forced to adopt since the outbreak of the war. The preconditions for implementing such measures are totally different and infinitely more unfavourable than in our case. They do not have the necessary administration and their population is unused to submitting to such privations. Then there is another reason why the uniform rationing of bread for the whole population will not be possible in England at this point. It was possible for Germany at a time in which bread could be substituted by other foodstuffs. That moment has been missed in England. But with only three fifths of the current sea borne trade, the continued supply with [alternative] foodstuffs cannot be maintained unless a severe rationing of grain is imposed—provided the war industry is to be maintained at its current output level. The objection that England could have sufficient domestic stockpiles of grain and raw materials has been disproved in detail in the attachment.

In addition to that, the unrestricted submarine campaign would cut off England from the trade with Denmark and the Netherlands, which would result in an immediate shortage of fats, since one third of all butter imports and the entire margarine imports to England originate in Denmark and the Netherlands respectively. Moreover, by threatening the sea routes to Scandinavia and intensifying activities against the Spanish iron-ore trade, it would result in a scarcity of iron-ore and wood. This will automatically reduce the coal production for lack of wood. In consequence it would also reduce the output of pig iron, steel, and subsequently the production of munitions, which depends on both. Finally, it gives us the long hoped for opportunity to strike at neutral munitions shipments, and thus it will also provide a relief for the army.

By contrast, a submarine campaign according to cruiser rules, even assuming the possibility of indiscriminate attacks on armed merchantmen, would only yield a reduction of the tonnage sailing for England by 5 × 400,000 tons—about 18%--or less than half of what could be achieved by unrestricted submarine warfare. Experience so far does not suggest that the authorization to torpedo armed merchantmen would improve upon the result of 400,000 tons of destroyed merchant tonnage, which has been achieved over the past two months. In fact, it is likely to merely compensate for a decline, which has to be expected in the course of progressing arming [of merchantmen]. I am aware that even a reduction of one fifth of English sea borne trade will have a severe impact on the English supply situation. However, I consider it unthinkable that the current English leadership under Lloyd George, who is absolutely determined, could be forced to make peace on these grounds, particularly since the constraints of fat, iron-ore, and wood scarcity—and the latter's impact on the munitions production—would not come into effect. Furthermore, the psychological effects of panic and terror cannot be exploited. These effects, which can only be achieved by a campaign of unrestricted submarine warfare are, in my view, an indispensable prerequisite for success. Just how important they are, can be judged by the experiences made when we initiated submarine warfare in early 1915, or even during the brief period of the submarine campaign in March and April 1916, when the British believed that we were serious about it.

A further precondition [for success] is that the beginning and the declaration of unrestricted submarine warfare should coincide in a manner that leaves no room for negotiations, particularly between England and the neutrals. Only then will the effect of shock have the most profound impact on the enemy and the neutrals.

VI.

Upon the declaration of unrestricted submarine warfare the United States government will once more be compelled to make a decision whether or not to take the consequences of its previous position vis-à-vis the unrestricted submarine warfare. I am absolutely of the opinion that war with the United States is such a serious matter that everything has to be undertaken to avoid it. Fear of a diplomatic rupture however, should not lead us to recoil from the use of a weapon that promises victory for us.

At any rate, it is realistic to assume the worst case as the most probable one and to consider, which impact an American entry into the war on the side of our enemies would have on the course of the war. In respect to the merchant tonnage this impact is likely to be negligible. It cannot be expected that more than a fraction of the interned central power tonnage in American—and perhaps in other neutral ports—can be put into the trade with England at short notice. The overwhelming part of it can be rendered useless in a manner that it will be unable to sail during the first, critical months. All preparations in this respect have been made. Also, there would be no crews available in the initial stages. The American troops would be of equally little import, if only for the lack of bottoms to carry them over here in great numbers; the same applies to American money, which cannot compensate the lack of tonnage. The only question that remains would be how America would react to a peace, which Great Britain would be forced to accept. It is unlikely that it would decide to continue the war against us, since it has no means to strike at us decisively, whereas its sea borne commerce would suffer from our submarines. Indeed, it is to be expected that it will join England in making peace, in order to restore healthy economic conditions.

Therefore my conclusion is that a campaign of unrestricted submarine warfare, launched in time to produce a peace before the harvest of the summer 1917—i.e. 1 August—has to accept the risk of American belligerence, because we have no other option. In spite of the diplomatic rupture with America, the unrestricted submarine warfare is nevertheless the right means to conclude this war victoriously. It is also the only means to this end.

VII.

Since I have declared the time come to strike against England in autumn 1916 the situation has even improved tremendously in our favour. The crop failure, in conjunction with the impact of the war on England up to now, gives us the opportunity to force a decision before the next harvest. If we do not make use of what seems to be the last chance, then I see no other option than that of mutual exhaustion, without our succeeding to bring the war to an end on terms that will guarantee our future as a world power.

In order to achieve the required results, the unrestricted submarine warfare has to commence no later than 1 February. I request from your Excellency an indication, whether the military situation on the continent, particularly in regard to the remaining neutrals, would allow this schedule. The necessary preparations can be completed within three weeks time.

(Signed) von Holtzendorff
