= Karl von Bock und Polach =

German politician

Carl Friedrich Wilhelm von Bock und Polach or Karl von Bock und Polach (28 October 1840 - 29 January 1902) was a local German politician.

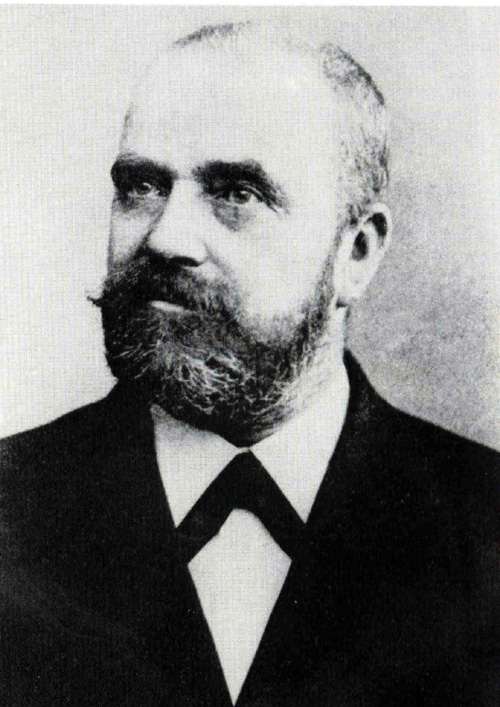
Karl von Bock und Polach

He was born in Mainz, Germany. He was elected as the Mayor of the city of Mülheim an der Ruhr in 1878 to 1895, where he died.
