= Friedrich Order =

Friedrich Order (Friedrichs-Orden)
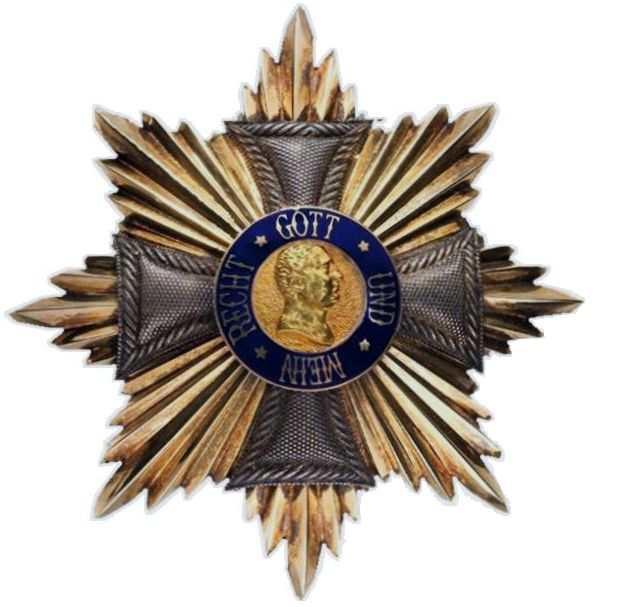
- Order Star
- Type: Military order
- Awarded for: Bravery and exceptionally meritorious deeds in combat
- Presented by: The Kingdom of Württemberg
- Eligibility: Württemberg military officers and officers of allied states
- Status: Obsolete
- Established: 1 January 1830
- First award: 1830
- Final award: 1918
- Ribbon of the order

The Friedrich Order (German: Friedrichs-Orden or Friedrichsorden) was an order of merit of the German Kingdom of Württemberg. It was instituted on 1 January 1830 by the second king of Württemberg, Wilhelm I in remembrance of his father, King Friedrich I. In 1918, the end of the monarchy meant the abolition of the order.

== Classes ==
The order was created with a single class, conferring nobility. On 3 January 1856, the Order was recreated with four classes were created and on 29 September 1870 a Knight 1st Class and a military division with swords were added (existing Knights were appointed Knights 1st Class). In 1892 the "Medal of the Order of Frederick" was added to the order. An additional rank was created on 6 March 1899, the Grand Cross with Crown (or Crown of the Grand Cross).

The classes were:

Grand Cross with Crown
Grand Cross
Commander 1st Class
Commander 2nd Class
Knight 1st Class
Knight 2nd Class
Medal

The ribbon was skyblue.

== Recipients ==
=== Grand Crosses ===
- Duke Adam of Württemberg
- Eugen von Albori
- Albrecht, Duke of Württemberg
- Alexander, Prince of Erbach-Schönberg
- Duke Alexander of Württemberg (1804–1885)
- Alexis, Prince of Bentheim and Steinfurt
- Prince August of Württemberg
- Gustav Bachmann
- Friedrich Wilhelm von Bismarck
- Herbert von Bismarck
- Max von Boehn (general)
- Paul von Breitenbach
- Bernhard von Bülow
- Stephan Burián von Rajecz
- Carl, Duke of Württemberg
- Charles I of Württemberg
- Bohuslav, Count Chotek of Chotkow and Wognin
- Constantine, Prince of Hohenzollern-Hechingen
- Ernst I, Prince of Hohenlohe-Langenburg
- Ernst II, Prince of Hohenlohe-Langenburg
- Géza Fejérváry
- Prince Frederick of Württemberg
- Woldemar Freedericksz
- Prince Friedrich Leopold of Prussia
- Friedrich von Gerok (officer)
- Colmar Freiherr von der Goltz
- Heinrich von Gossler
- Gottlieb Graf von Haeseler
- Wilhelm von Hahnke
- Heinrich VII, Prince Reuss of Köstritz
- Prince Hermann of Saxe-Weimar-Eisenach (1825–1901)
- Paul von Hindenburg
- Eberhard von Hofacker
- Dietrich von Hülsen-Haeseler
- Karl Anton, Prince of Hohenzollern
- Hans von Kirchbach
- Konstantin of Hohenlohe-Schillingsfürst
- Prince Kraft zu Hohenlohe-Ingelfingen
- Emich, 5th Prince of Leiningen
- Alexander von Linsingen
- Otto von Moser
- Georg Alexander von Müller
- Duke Nicholas of Württemberg
- Adolphe Niel
- Duke Paul Wilhelm of Württemberg
- Philipp Albrecht, Duke of Württemberg
- Philipp Ernst, 8th Prince of Hohenlohe-Schillingsfürst
- Duke Philipp of Württemberg
- Philipp, Prince of Eulenburg
- Hans von Plessen
- Antoni Wilhelm Radziwiłł
- Duke Robert of Württemberg
- Gustav Rümelin
- Willem Anne Schimmelpenninck van der Oye
- Alfred von Schlieffen
- Gustav von Senden-Bibran
- Heinrich von Stephan
- Francis, Duke of Teck
- Alfred von Tirpitz
- Reginald Tower
- Julius von Verdy du Vernois
- Eduard Vogel von Falckenstein
- Alfred von Waldersee
- Wilhelm Karl, Duke of Urach
- Wilhelm, Duke of Urach
- William II of Württemberg
- Duke William of Württemberg
- Duke Eugen of Württemberg (1846–1877)
- Ferdinand von Zeppelin
- August zu Eulenburg

=== Commanders 1st Class ===
- Friedrich von Beck-Rzikowsky
- Max von Bock und Polach
- Paul Puhallo von Brlog
- Josias von Heeringen
- Leopold von Ranke
- Martin Chales de Beaulieu
- Ewald von Lochow
- Friedrich von Scholl
- Karl von Wedel

=== Commanders 2nd Class ===
- Karl von Bülow
- August von Heeringen
- Wilhelm Heye
- Eduard von Kallee
- Walther Reinhardt
- Prince Rudolf of Liechtenstein
- Ernst von Prittwitz und Gaffron
- Adolf von Trotha

=== Knights 1st Class ===
- Paul Bader
- Ludwig Beck
- Gottlob Berger
- Moritz von Bissing
- Walther von Brauchitsch
- Charles of Solms-Hohensolms-Lich
- Kurt Eberhard
- Walther Fischer von Weikersthal
- Werner von Fritsch
- Curt Haase
- Paul Hausser
- Waldemar Henrici
- Paul Hocheisen
- Leonhard Kaupisch
- Maximilian von Laffert
- Oswald Lutz
- Erich von Manstein
- Franz Mattenklott
- Curt von Morgen
- Erwin Rommel
- Richard Ruoff
- Ehrhard Schmidt
- Hans Schmidt (general of the Infantry)
- Hugo Sperrle
- Hans Graf von Sponeck
- Aaron Tänzer
- Walther Wever (general)

=== Knights 2nd Class ===
- Carl Bolle
- Hermann Kling
- Friedrich Sixt von Armin
- Wilhelm Burgdorf

=== Others ===
- Paul von Bruns
- Anna Mehlig
- Walther Schroth
- Oskar von Watter
