= Josias von Heeringen =

German general (1850–1926)

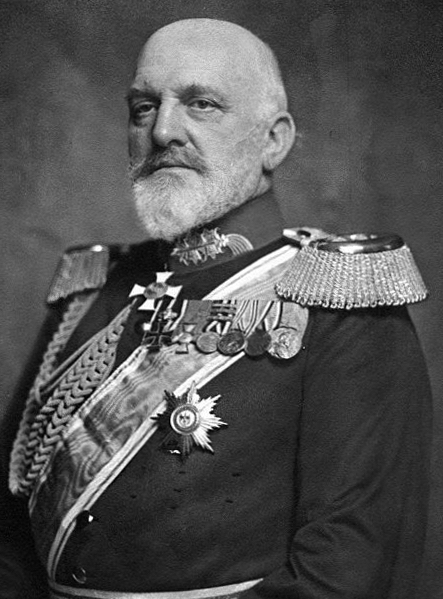
- Born: 9 March 1850; Kassel, Electorate of Hesse
- Died: 9 October 1926 (aged 76); Berlin-Charlottenburg, Germany
- Military career
- Allegiance: German Empire
- Branch: Imperial German Army
- Service years: 1867–1918
- Rank: Generaloberst
- Commands: 117th Infantry Regiment; 22nd Division; II Corps; 7th Army; German Coastal Defence
- Conflicts: Franco-Prussian War; World War I
- Awards: Pour le Mérite with Oak Leaves

Josias von Heeringen (9 March 1850 – 9 October 1926) was a German general of the German Empire who served as Prussian Minister of War and saw service in the First World War.

== Early life ==
Heeringen was born in Kassel in the Electorate of Hesse. He was the son of Josias von Heeringen (1809–1885) and his wife Karoline von Starkloff (1817–1871). His younger brother August von Heeringen (* 26. November 1855 in Kassel; † 29. September 1927 in Berlin), served as a naval officer and was a Chief of the German Imperial Admiralty Staff. Josias von Heeringen married in 1874 Augusta von Dewall.

== Career ==
After having served on various posts, in 1887 he became a major in the Prussian Ministry of War. From 1892 to 1895, he was a department head on the German General Staff. In 1898 he was appointed a Major-General and chosen to head the Army Administration Department of the Ministry of War.

In 1901 he was made a Generalleutnant and in 1903 became head of the 22nd Division. In 1906 he was made a General der Infanterie, and also commander of the II Army Corps, whose headquarters was in Stettin. From 1909 to 1913, he was Prussian Minister of War. Just like his predecessors, Heinrich von Gossler and Karl von Einem, von Heeringen thought that the army should not be expanded too quickly as wished by the General Staff. Instead he emphasized reformist efforts, placed more on the technical perfection of the army and the quality of the training. Heeringen stopped the immediate formation of three new army corps, delaying them to be planned for 1916 to 1921. This drew the ire of Chief of Staff Helmuth von Moltke and other officers like department chief Erich Ludendorff. Heeringen asked to be released from his post in 1913. Afterwards he became Inspector-General of the II Army Inspectorate, headquartered in Berlin.

When World War I began in August 1914 he was made commander of the Seventh Army, the army that was being used as a decoy for the attempted German invasion of France. He successfully defended Alsace against the French in the Battle of Mulhouse, for which he was awarded the Pour le Mérite on 28 August 1915. He'd receive the oak leaves one year later. In 1914 he had also received the Freedom of the City of Kassel. He commanded the Seventh Army until 1916, when he was transferred to command the German Coastal Defence for the rest of the war. He left active service with the rank of a Colonel General.

== Later life ==
From 1918 to 1926, he was president of the Kyffhäuserbund. He died on 9 October 1926 in Berlin-Charlottenburg.

== Honours and awards ==
- Kingdom of Prussia:
  - Iron Cross (1870), 2nd Class
  - Service Award Cross
  - Knight of the Black Eagle, with Collar 01.06.1912
  - Knight of the Royal Crown Order, 1st Class
  - Pour le Mérite (military), 28 August 1915; with Oak Leaves, 28 August 1916
- Baden:
  - Commander of the Zahringer Lion, 2nd Class, 1893
  - Grand Cross of the Order of Berthold the First, 1909
- Kingdom of Bavaria:
  - Grand Cross of the Military Merit Order
  - Prince Regent Luitpold Medal on Band of Jubilee Medal
- Grand Duchy of Hesse: Commander of the Merit Order of Philip the Magnanimous, 2nd Class, 10 June 1897; Grand Cross with Crown, 23 August 1911
- Oldenburg: Grand Cross of the Order of Duke Peter Friedrich Ludwig
- Kingdom of Saxony:
  - Knight of the Rue Crown
  - Grand Cross of the Albert Order, with Golden Star
- Württemberg:
  - Knight of the Württemberg Crown, 1889; Grand Cross
  - Commander of the Friedrich Order, 1st Class, 1900
- (Austrian Empire) (Kingdom of Hungary) Austria-Hungary: Grand Cross of the Royal Hungarian Order of St. Stephen, 1912
- Belgium: Grand Cordon of the Order of Leopold
- Chile: Medal of the Merit, 1st Class
- Empire of Japan:
  - Grand Cordon of the Rising Sun
  - Order of Meiji, 2nd Class
- Ottoman Empire: Order of Osmanieh, 1st Class

Political offices
Preceded by Karl von Einem	Prussian Minister of War; 1909–1913	Succeeded by Erich von Falkenhayn
Military offices
Preceded by General der Kavallerie Arnold von Langenbeck	Commander, II Corps; 21 September 1906 – 1 September 1909	Succeeded by General der Infanterie Alexander von Linsingen
Preceded by Formed from II Army Inspectorate (II. Armee-Inspektion)	Commander, 7th Army; 2 August 1914 – 28 August 1916	Succeeded by General der Artillerie Richard von Schubert
Preceded by Generaloberst Ludwig von Falkenhausen	Commander, High Command of Coastal Defence; 29 August 1916 – 19 September 1918	Succeeded by Dissolved
