= German Imperial Naval Cabinet =

Government personnel office of the Imperial German Navy

German Imperial Naval Cabinet Marinekabinett
Agency overview
- Formed: 1889
- Preceding agency: German Imperial Admiralty
- Dissolved: 1918
- Jurisdiction: German Empire
- Agency executive: Chief of the Naval Cabinet

The German Imperial Naval Cabinet (German: Marinekabinett), a government office of the German Imperial Navy, 1871-1918, was responsible for commanding naval officers, marine officers, engineers, naval stores, and munitions.

In 1889 Kaiser Wilhelm II reorganised top-level control of the Navy by establishing a Navy Cabinet (Marine-Kabinett), equivalent to the German Imperial Military Cabinet which had previously functioned in the same capacity for both the army and navy. The Head of the navy cabinet was responsible for promotions, appointments, administration and issuing orders to naval forces.

Captain Gustav Freiherr von Senden-Bibran, appointed as its first head, remained in office until 1906. The existing Imperial admiralty was abolished in 1889 and its responsibilities divided between two organizations. A new position was created, the chief of the Imperial Naval High Command, being responsible for ship deployments, strategy and tactics. The holder of the title was equivalent to the supreme commander of the Army.

The Naval Cabinet became, in practice, the decisive authority in personnel matters for naval officers. It was directly subordinate to the Emperor and not accountable to the Reichstag.

The Chief of the Naval Cabinet was always a high naval officer who also acted as an adjutant to the Emperor. The first Chief of the Naval Cabinet (1889 to 1906) was Admiral Baron Gustav von Senden-Bibran. Admiral Georg Alexander von Müller succeeded him and served until 1918.

The Cabinet also functioned as the naval cabinet of Prussia.

In December 1918 the Cabinet became the Reich Naval Personnel Office of the Weimar Republic.

== Chiefs of the Naval Cabinet (Chef des Marinekabinetts) ==
No.	Portrait	Chief of the Naval Cabinet	Took office	Left office	Time in office
1	Gustav Freiherr von Senden-Bibran	Admiral; Gustav Freiherr von Senden-Bibran (1847–1909)	28 March 1889	7 July 1906	17 years, 101 days
2	Georg Alexander von Müller	Admiral; Georg Alexander von Müller (1854–1940)	9 July 1906	29 October 1918	12 years, 112 days
