= Order of the Zähringer Lion =

State order

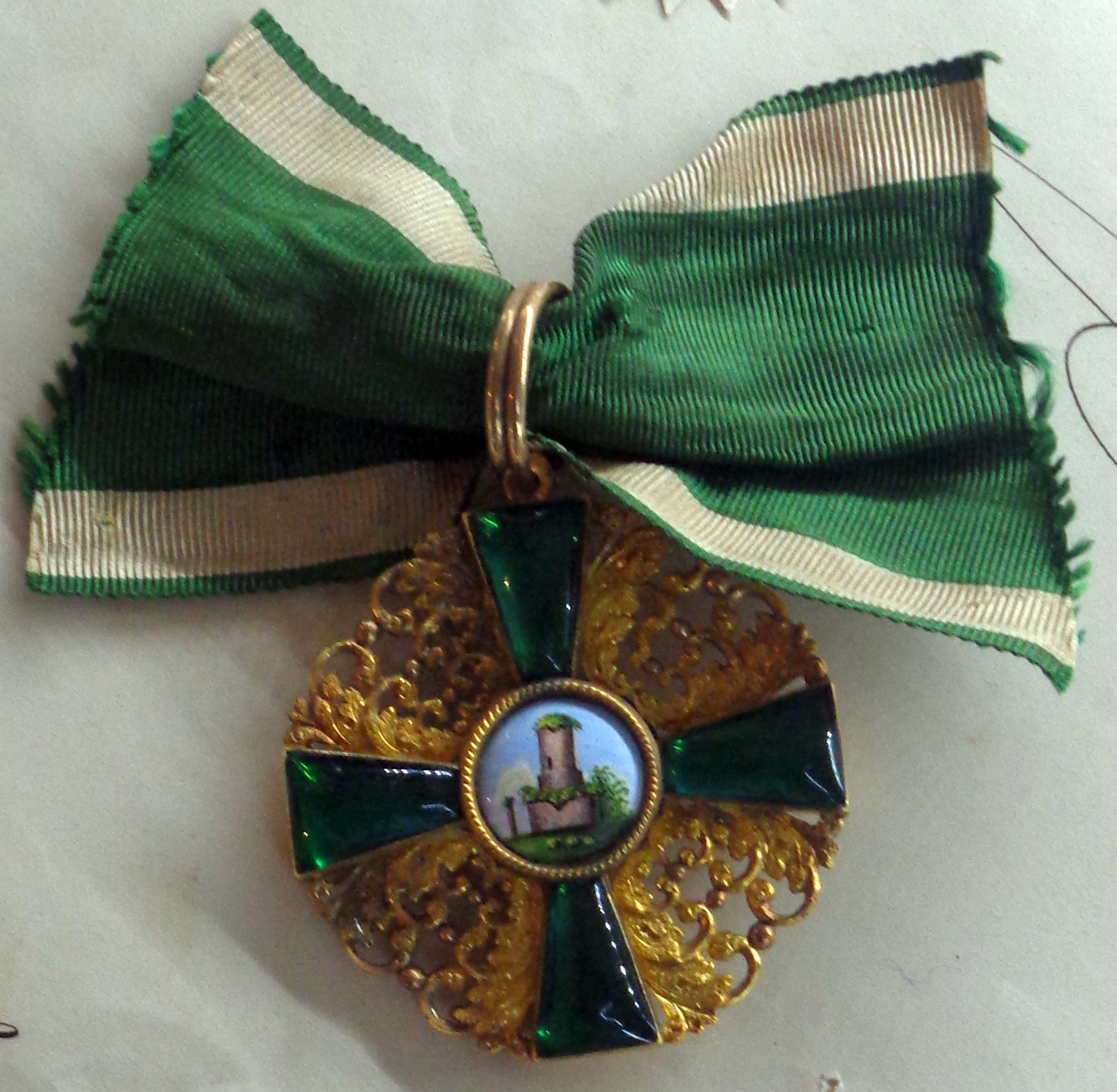
- Insignia of the order

Awarded by the Grand Duchy of Baden
- Type: State order
- Motto: FÜR EHRE UND WAHRHEIT
- Sovereign: Grand Duke of Baden
- Grades: Five

Precedence
- Next (higher): Order of Berthold the First
- Ribbon of the order

The Order of the Zähringer Lion was instituted on 26 December 1812 by Karl, Grand Duke of Baden, in memory of the Dukes of Zähringen from whom he was descended.

== Classes ==
It had five classes:

- Grand Cross
- Commander, First Class
- Commander, Second Class
- Knight, First Class
- Knight, Second Class

== Insignia ==
The order's insignia consists of a green enameled cross with four arms of equal length, whose angles are filled out with golden clasps. The gold-edged medallion shows the tribal symbol of the Zähringers in coloured enamel. Around the circle is the order's motto, FÜR EHRE UND WAHRHEIT (German for "FOR HONOUR AND TRUTH"). On the back, the Zähringer lion is portrayed on a red background. The order's ribbon is green with orange-yellow stripes along the edges.

For special awards, the order was granted with oak leaves and from 1866, it could also be awarded with crossed swords for military services. The oak leaves originally carried an "L" cipher, which went out of use in 1866. Moreover, in exceptional cases, the grand cross award could also be covered in diamonds
