= SMS Elsass =

Battleship of the German Imperial Navy

- Elsass underway c. 1904–1908

History

Germany
- Name: Elsass
- Namesake: Alsace
- Builder: Schichau-Werke, Danzig
- Laid down: 26 May 1901
- Launched: 26 May 1903
- Commissioned: 29 November 1904
- Decommissioned: 25 February 1930
- Stricken: 31 March 1931
- Fate: Scrapped in 1936

General characteristics
- Class & type: Braunschweig-class battleship
- Displacement: Normal: 13,208 t (12,999 long tons); Full load: 14,394 t (14,167 long tons)
- Length: 127.7 m (419 ft) (loa)
- Beam: 22.2 m (73 ft)
- Draft: 8.1 m (27 ft)
- Installed power: 16,000 metric horsepower (15,781 ihp; 11,768 kW); 8 × water-tube boilers; 6 × cylindrical boilers
- Propulsion: 3 × triple-expansion steam engines; 3 × screw propellers
- Speed: 18 knots (33 km/h; 21 mph)
- Range: 5,200 nautical miles (9,600 km; 6,000 mi); 10 knots (20 km/h; 10 mph)
- Complement: 35 officers; 708 enlisted men
- Armament: 4 × 28 cm (11 in) SK L/40 guns; 14 × 17 cm (6.7 in) SK L/40 guns; 18 × 8.8 cm (3.5 in) SK L/35 guns; 6 × 45 cm (17.7 in) torpedo tubes
- Armor: Belt: 110 to 250 mm (4.3 to 9.8 in); Turrets: 250 mm (9.8 in); Deck: 40 mm (1.6 in)

SMS Elsass (Note: "SMS" stands for "Seiner Majestät Schiff" (English: His Majesty's Ship).) was the second of five pre-dreadnought battleships of the Braunschweig class in the German Imperial Navy. She was laid down in May 1901, launched in May 1903, and commissioned in November 1904, though an accident during sea trials delayed her completion until May 1905. She was named for the German province of Elsass, now the French region of Alsace. Her sister ships were Braunschweig, Hessen, Preussen and Lothringen. The ship was armed with a battery of four 28 cm (11 in) guns and had a top speed of 18 knots (33 km/h; 21 mph). Like all other pre-dreadnoughts built at the turn of the century, Elsass was quickly made obsolete by the launching of the revolutionary HMS Dreadnought in 1906; as a result, her career as a frontline battleship was cut short.

The ship served in II Squadron of the German fleet after commissioning, and during this period, she was occupied with extensive annual training, as well as making good-will visits to foreign countries. Surpassed by new dreadnought battleships, Elsass was decommissioned in 1913, though she was reactivated a year later following the outbreak of World War I and assigned to IV Battle Squadron. Elsass saw action in the Baltic Sea against the Russian Navy. In August 1915, she participated in the Battle of the Gulf of Riga, during which she engaged the Russian battleship Slava. In 1916, she was placed in reserve because of crew shortages and the threat of British submarines operating in the Baltic, and she spent the remainder of the war as a training ship.

She was retained after the war under the terms of the Treaty of Versailles, and was modernized in 1923–1924. Elsass served in the Reichsmarine with the surface fleet until 1930, conducting training operations and visits to foreign ports as she had earlier in her career. In 1930, she was again placed in reserve, and the following year she was stricken from the naval register. Elsass was used for a short time as a hulk in Wilhelmshaven. The outdated battleship was sold to Norddeutscher Lloyd in late 1935 and was broken up for scrap the following year.

== Design ==
Plan and profile drawing of the Braunschweig class

With the passage of the Second Naval Law under the direction of Vizeadmiral (VAdm—Vice Admiral) Alfred von Tirpitz in 1900, funding was allocated for a new class of battleships, to succeed the Wittelsbach-class ships authorized under the 1898 Naval Law. By this time, Krupp, the supplier of naval artillery to the Kaiserliche Marine (Imperial Navy) had developed quick-firing, 28-centimeter (11 in) guns; the largest guns that had previously incorporated the technology were the 24 cm (9.4 in) guns mounted on the Wittelsbachs. The Design Department of the Reichsmarineamt (Imperial Navy Office) adopted these guns for the new battleships, along with an increase from 15 cm (5.9 in) to 17 cm (6.7 in) for the secondary battery, owing to the increased threat from torpedo boats as torpedoes became more effective.

Though the Braunschweig class marked a significant improvement over earlier German battleships, its design fell victim to the rapid pace of technological development in the early 1900s. The British battleship HMS Dreadnought—armed with ten 12-inch (30.5 cm) guns—was commissioned in December 1906, just a year after Elsass entered service. Dreadnought's revolutionary design rendered every capital ship of the German navy obsolete, including Elsass.

Elsass was 127.7 m (419 ft) long overall and had a beam of 22.2 m (72 ft 10 in) and a draft of 8.1 m (26 ft 7 in) forward. She displaced 13,208 t (12,999 long tons) as designed and 14,394 t (14,167 long tons) at full load. Her crew consisted of 35 officers and 708 enlisted men. The ship was powered by three 3-cylinder vertical triple expansion engines that drove three screws. Steam was provided by eight naval and six cylindrical boilers, and all of which burned coal. Elsass's powerplant was rated at 16,000 indicated horsepower (12,000 kW), which generated a designed top speed of 18 knots (33 km/h; 21 mph). She could steam 5,200 nautical miles (9,600 km; 6,000 mi) at a cruising speed of 10 knots (19 km/h; 12 mph).

Elsass's armament consisted of a main battery of four 28 cm (11 in) SK L/40 guns in twin gun turrets, (Note: In Imperial German Navy gun nomenclature, "SK" (Schnelladekanone) denotes that the gun is quick firing, while the L/40 denotes the length of the gun. In this case, the L/40 gun is 40 calibers, meaning that the gun is 40 times as long as it is in diameter.) one fore and one aft of the central superstructure. Her secondary armament was composed of fourteen 17 cm (6.7 inch) SK L/40 guns and eighteen 8.8 cm (3.5 in) SK L/35 quick-firing guns. Her armament was further increased by six 45 cm (17.7 in) torpedo tubes, all mounted submerged in the hull. One tube was in the bow, two were on each broadside, and the final tube was in the stern. Elsass was protected with Krupp armor. Her armored belt was 110 to 225 millimeters (4.3 to 8.9 in) thick, with the heavier armor in the central citadel that protected her magazines and machinery spaces, and the thinner plating at either end of the hull. Her deck was 40 mm (1.6 in) thick. The main battery turrets had 250 mm of armor plating.

== Service history ==
=== Pre-war career ===
Elsass on the slipway before her launch

Elsass was laid down on 26 May 1901 at the Schichau-Werke in Danzig under construction number 97. The second unit of her class, she was ordered under the contract name "J" as a new unit for the fleet. (Note: German warships were ordered under provisional names. Additions to the fleet were given a single letter; ships intended to replace older or lost vessels were ordered as "Ersatz (name of the ship to be replaced)".) Elsass was launched on 26 May 1903, and the launching ceremony was attended by Hermann zu Hohenlohe-Langenburg, the Reichsstatthalter (Governor) of the ship's namesake province. The ship was transferred to Kiel on 26 October 1904 by a shipyard crew. She was commissioned into the fleet on 29 November 1904 and began sea trials thereafter. These were interrupted on 15 December, when the ship's rudder broke, forcing her to return for repairs that lasted until February 1905. Elsass then returned to trials, which were completed by May. She thereafter joined II Squadron, replacing the old coastal defense ship Frithjof. Her first commander was then-Kapitän zur See (KzS—Captain at Sea) Hugo von Pohl, who remained in the position until September 1905.

For the next several years, Elsass and the rest of the fleet were occupied with the peacetime training regimen that consisted of squadron and fleet training in April and May and a major fleet cruise during the summer, followed by annual fall maneuvers with the whole fleet in August and September. The year would typically conclude with a winter training cruise. For Elsass, her career began with squadron training in the North Sea and Baltic Sea in May 1905, followed by the summer cruise in July and August. In August, before the annual fleet maneuvers, the British Channel Fleet visited the German fleet in Swinemünde. KzS Gustav Bachmann took command of the ship in September. The year 1906 followed the same pattern, concluding with fleet exercises in the North Sea in December before returning to Kiel. Further maneuvers in the North Sea occupied the fleet for much of the first half of 1907, followed by a summer cruise to Norway and the annual autumn maneuvers in August and September. KzS Reinhard Scheer replaced Bachmann in October 1907. The winter cruise that year went to the Baltic.

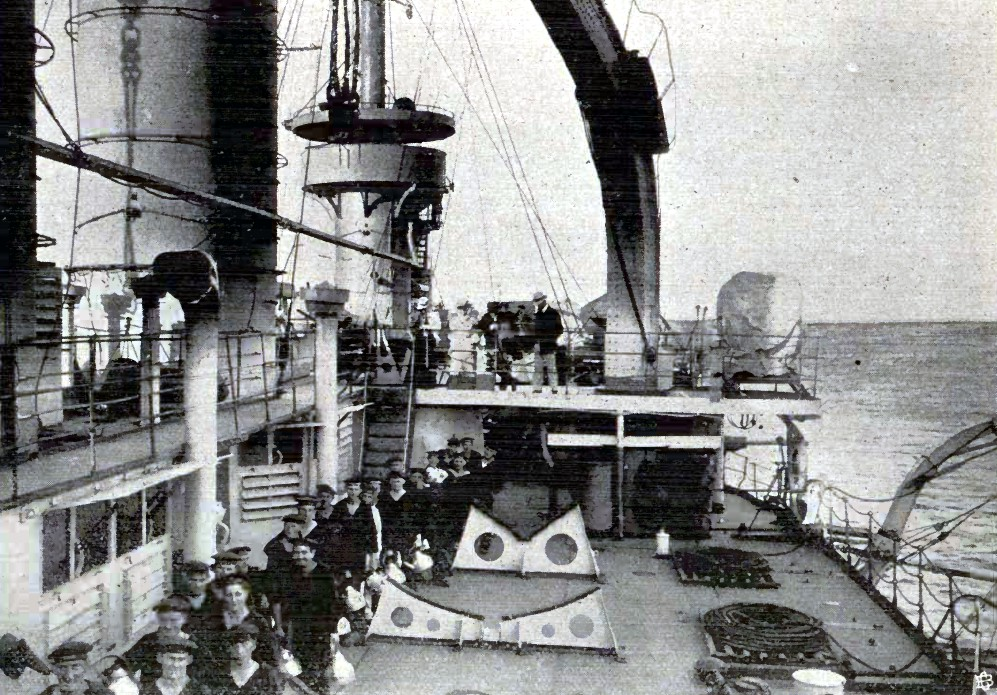
Tea dispensing on the ship lying in front of Travemünde (1908)

On 28 April 1908, a significant accident occurred aboard Elsass, when a round of ammunition exploded. Three men were killed and another six were wounded. In 1908 and 1909, the fleet, which had been renamed the High Seas Fleet, undertook major cruises into the Atlantic Ocean. During the first, which began on 13 July 1908, Elsass stopped in Las Palmas from 23 July to 1 August before returning to Germany on 13 August for the autumn maneuvers. The 1909 cruise began on 7 July and lasted until 1 August, and included a visit to Ferrol, Spain from 18 to 25 July. In September, KzS Hubert von Rebeur-Paschwitz replaced Scheer as the ship's commander. The year 1910 followed the same pattern of individual, squadron, and fleet training as in previous years. For the summer cruises of 1910 and 1911, the German fleet went to Norwegian waters; both years also saw winter cruises in the western Baltic. On 14 December 1910, while conducting individual training, Elsass collided with the battleship Schwaben, though neither ship was seriously damaged. KzS Carl Schaumann took command of the ship in September 1911, though he remained in command for just a month, being replaced by KzS Hugo Langemak in October. Elsass was transferred to I Squadron on 3 October, trading places with the battleship Schlesien.

On 23 March 1912, during fleet training, Elsass accidentally collided with a Swedish steamship—Pollux—in heavy fog in the western entrance to the Skagerrak. Pollux was badly damaged in the accident and sank, though Elsass was able to take off her crew. In April, Elsass served as a target ship during gunfire training with the armored cruiser Blücher in a demonstration held off the Faroe Islands. On the 29th of the month, the new dreadnought battleship Oldenburg replaced Elsass in I Squadron, and the latter had her crew reduced. On 24 August, the ship received her full complement again, to allow Elsass to take part in the annual maneuvers with the newly formed III Squadron. She also came under the temporary command of KzS Leberecht Maass. After the exercises, the squadron was dissolved, and on 29 September Elsass again had her crew reduced. She returned to active duty on 1 December, when she was assigned to V Division of III Squadron, along with her sister ship Braunschweig and the new dreadnought Kaiser. The ships began the year with individual training, followed by divisional exercises in the Baltic later in January 1913. In early March, fleet exercises were held in the North Sea. Elsass was sent to Kiel on 17 March to begin preparations for her decommissioning, as her place in the division was taken by the new dreadnought Kaiserin. On 13 May, Elsass was decommissioned and assigned to the Reserve Division of the Baltic Sea. Effective 15 October, she was assigned to the Marinestation der Ostsee (Naval Station of the Baltic Sea).

=== World War I ===
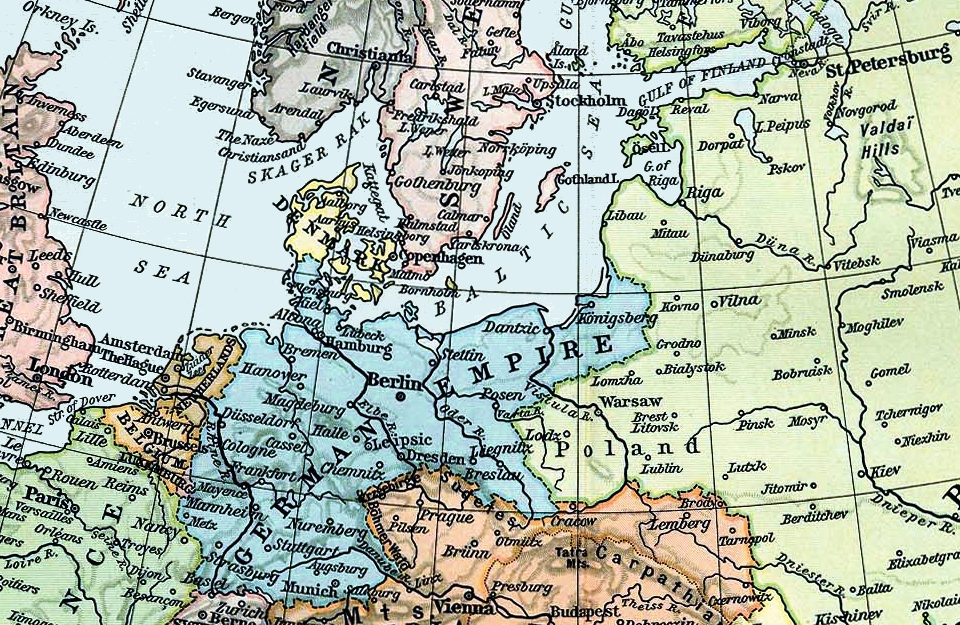
Map of the North and Baltic Seas in 1911

On 28 July 1914, Germany's ally Austria-Hungary declared war on Serbia, beginning World War I. Three days later, Elsass was reactivated as the European powers moved toward war, and she was assigned to IV Battle Squadron. The unit also included her sister ship Braunschweig and the five Wittelsbach-class battleships, and was commanded by Vizeadmiral Ehrhard Schmidt. Elsass began individual and then squadron training, which lasted until early September. The training exercises were interrupted on 26 August, when the squadron and the armored cruisers Roon and Prinz Adalbert and the light cruiser Gazelle were sent to rescue the stranded light cruiser Magdeburg, which had run aground off the island of Odensholm in the eastern Baltic. By 28 August, however, the ship's crew had been forced to detonate explosives to destroy Magdeburg before the relief force had arrived. As a result, Braunschweig and the rest of the squadron returned to Bornholm that day.

Starting on 2 September, IV Squadron, assisted by Blücher, conducted a sweep into the Baltic. The operation lasted until 9 September and failed to bring Russian naval units to battle. From 11 to 20 September, Elsass and the rest of the division was transferred to the mouth of the Elbe to provide local defense against possible British attacks. Later that month, the IV Squadron ships were transferred back to the Baltic. The army had requested that the navy make a demonstration to keep Russian reserves along the Baltic coast, instead of allowing the Russians to re-deploy them to Galicia. The older battleships of the V Battle Squadron were sent to Danzig to embark ground forces, while Braunschweig and IV Squadron steamed in advance. The operation was called off early, however, after British submarines were reportedly sighted in the Baltic. The two squadrons rendezvoused off Bornholm before proceeded on to Kiel, arriving on 26 September.

Elsass returned to the Elbe from 5 December to 1 March 1915, with scheduled periodic maintenance from 24 to 28 February. After guard ship duties in the Elbe ended, she was briefly transferred to the Schillig Roads, outside Wilhelmshaven, from 1 to 9 March. Beginning on 2 April, Elsass began training exercises in the Baltic, followed by another shipyard period from 26 April to 16 May at the Kaiserliche Werft (Imperial Shipyard) in Kiel. She returned to provide coastal defense in the Elbe on 27 May. On 4 July 1915, following the loss of the minelaying cruiser Albatross in the Baltic, the IV Squadron ships were transferred to reinforce the German naval forces in the area. Additionally, the army requested naval support for the Army of the Niemen, which was operating in Courland. On 7–11 and 18–19 July, German cruisers, with the IV Squadron ships in support, conducted sweeps in the Baltic, though without engaging any Russian forces. During the latter operation, Elsass collided with the torpedo boat G175, though she inflicted only minor damage.

In August 1915, the German fleet attempted to clear the Gulf of Riga of Russian naval forces to assist the German Army then advancing on the city. IV Squadron was joined by I Squadron, which consisted of the eight Nassau and Helgoland-class battleships, from the High Seas Fleet, as well as three battlecruisers and many smaller craft. The task force was commanded by Vizeadmiral Franz von Hipper, though operational command remained with Schmidt. On the morning of 8 August, the German fleet made its initial push into the Gulf. Elsass and Braunschweig were assigned to attack the Russian pre-dreadnought Slava to prevent her from disrupting the German minesweepers. The German vessels engaged Slava and the gunboat Khrabry at long range without result. When it became clear that the minesweepers could not clear the minefield before nightfall, Schmidt called off the attempt. A second attempt was made on 16 August. Elsass remained outside the Gulf, while the dreadnoughts Nassau and Posen dealt with Slava. By 19 August, the Russian minefields had been cleared and the flotilla entered the Gulf. However, reports of Allied submarines in the area prompted the German fleet to call off the operation the following day.

After the operation, Elsass remained in Libau, and IV Squadron was disbanded on 18 December. While in Libau, Elsass briefly served as the command ship for Vizeadmiral Friedrich Schultz, the Befehlshaber der Aufklärungsschiffe der Ostsee (Commander of Reconnaissance Forces in the Baltic), from January to March 1916. By that time, Braunschweig, which had been modified in Kiel to serve as Schultz's command ship, arrived to relieve Elsass. Crew shortages forced the navy to reduce both ships' crews, to the point that they were only capable of providing local defense of the harbor. On 10 July, Elsass was transferred back to Kiel, where four days later her crew was transferred to her sister Lothringen. Elsass was taken into the shipyard in Kiel for repairs before returning to service on 25 July as a stationary training ship assigned to I Marine Inspectorate. She remained in Kiel until her decommissioning on 20 June 1918. The ship underwent an overhaul and returned to training duty in October, though Germany surrendered the following month.

=== Postwar career ===
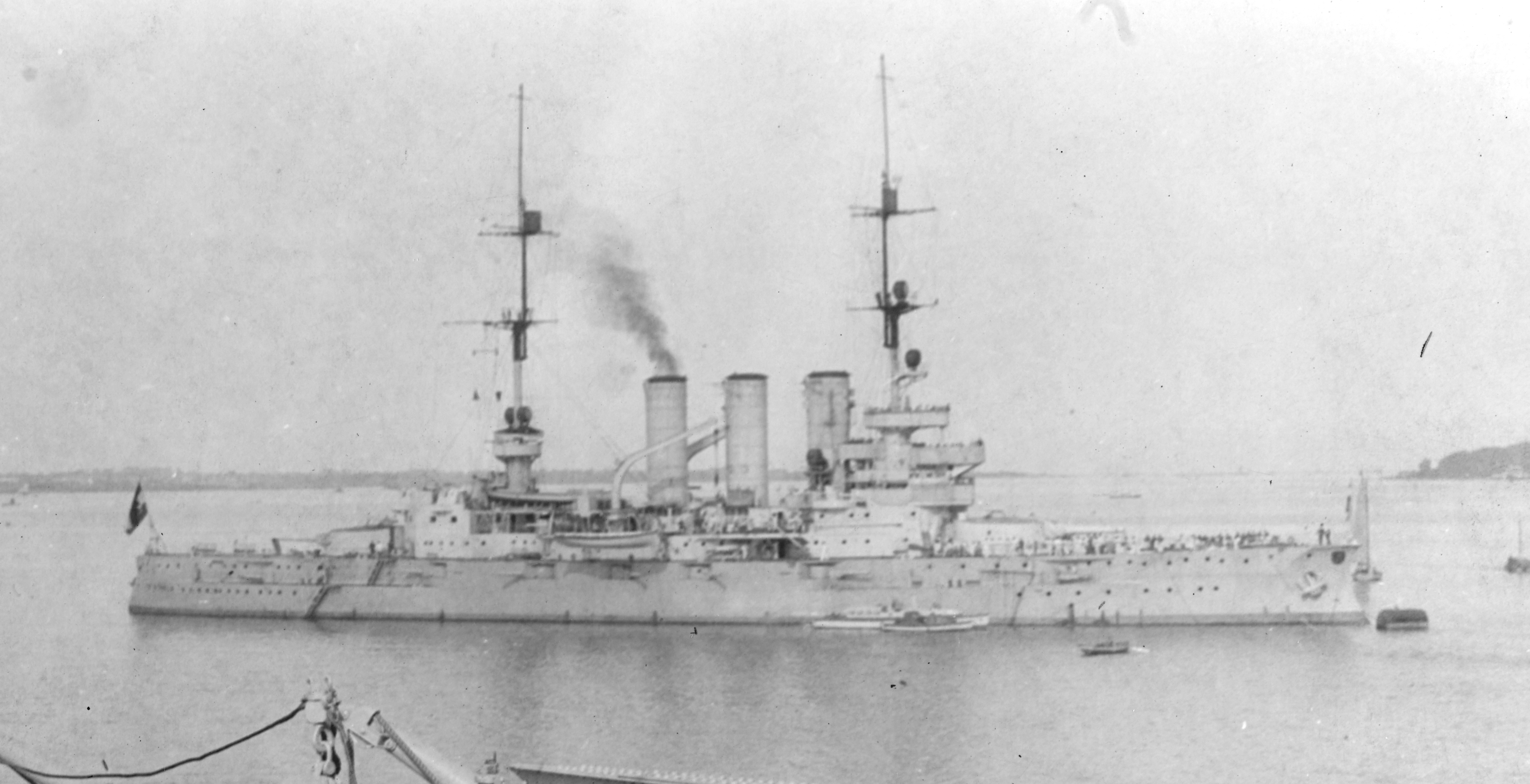
Elsass in Kiel in 1926

The Treaty of Versailles, which ended the war, specified that Germany was permitted to retain six battleships of the older "Deutschland or Lothringen class." (Note: Treaty of Versailles Section II: Naval Clauses, Article 181.) Elsass was kept and used as a training ship in the German fleet, which was renamed the Reichsmarine. In 1923, the aging ship underwent a major overhaul. Elsass was dry-docked in the Reichsmarinewerft in Wilhelmshaven, where the conning tower was rebuilt. Work was completed the following year. She was recommissioned on 15 February 1924 with a partial crew. Assigned to the Linienschiffsdivision (Battleship Division) of the Seestreitkräfte der Nordsee (Naval Forces of the North Sea) and based in Wilhelmshaven, the ship received her full crew by 1 April. In July, she joined the rest of the fleet for a major training cruise in the Atlantic, which included a stop in Vigo, Spain, from 6 to 13 July. In 1925, Elsass and the battleship Hannover visited Oslo, Norway, from 19 to 24 June, though Elsass proceeded alone to Odda, where she stayed from 26 to 30 June.

On 1 October, the ship was transferred to the Seestreitkräfte der Ostsee (Naval Forces of the Baltic Sea), which was based in Kiel. The fleet went on another major cruise in the Atlantic and the Mediterranean Sea in May and June 1926; during the trip Elsass made calls in several Spanish ports, including Mahón, Barcelona, and Vigo. Another cruise followed the next year in April and May, with stops in Vilagarcía, Spain, São Vicente, Madeira, Santa Cruz de Tenerife and Santa Cruz de La Palma in the Canary Islands, Horta and Ponta Delgada in the Azores, and Lisbon, Portugal. In 1928, Elsass made visits to Ulvik and Bergen in Norway in July, and Skagen, Denmark, in September. The winter of 1928–1929 proved to be especially cold, and Elsass and the battleship Schleswig-Holstein were pressed into service as icebreakers; the two ships helped to free 65 merchant ships from the heavy ice. In March 1929, Elsass also performed icebreaking duties off Gedser, Denmark.

The fleet went on another Atlantic cruise in April 1929, and Elsass made calls in Villagarcia and A Pobra do Caramiñal, Spain. That fall, the ship visited Karlskrona, Sweden. Elsass was withdrawn from active service on 25 February 1930. She was stricken from the naval register on 31 March 1931 and served as a hulk in Wilhelmshaven until 31 October 1935, when the Reichsmarine sold her to Technischer Betrieb des Norddeutscher Lloyd. Elsass was broken up for scrap the following year.
