= Franz von Hipper =

German admiral (1863–1932)

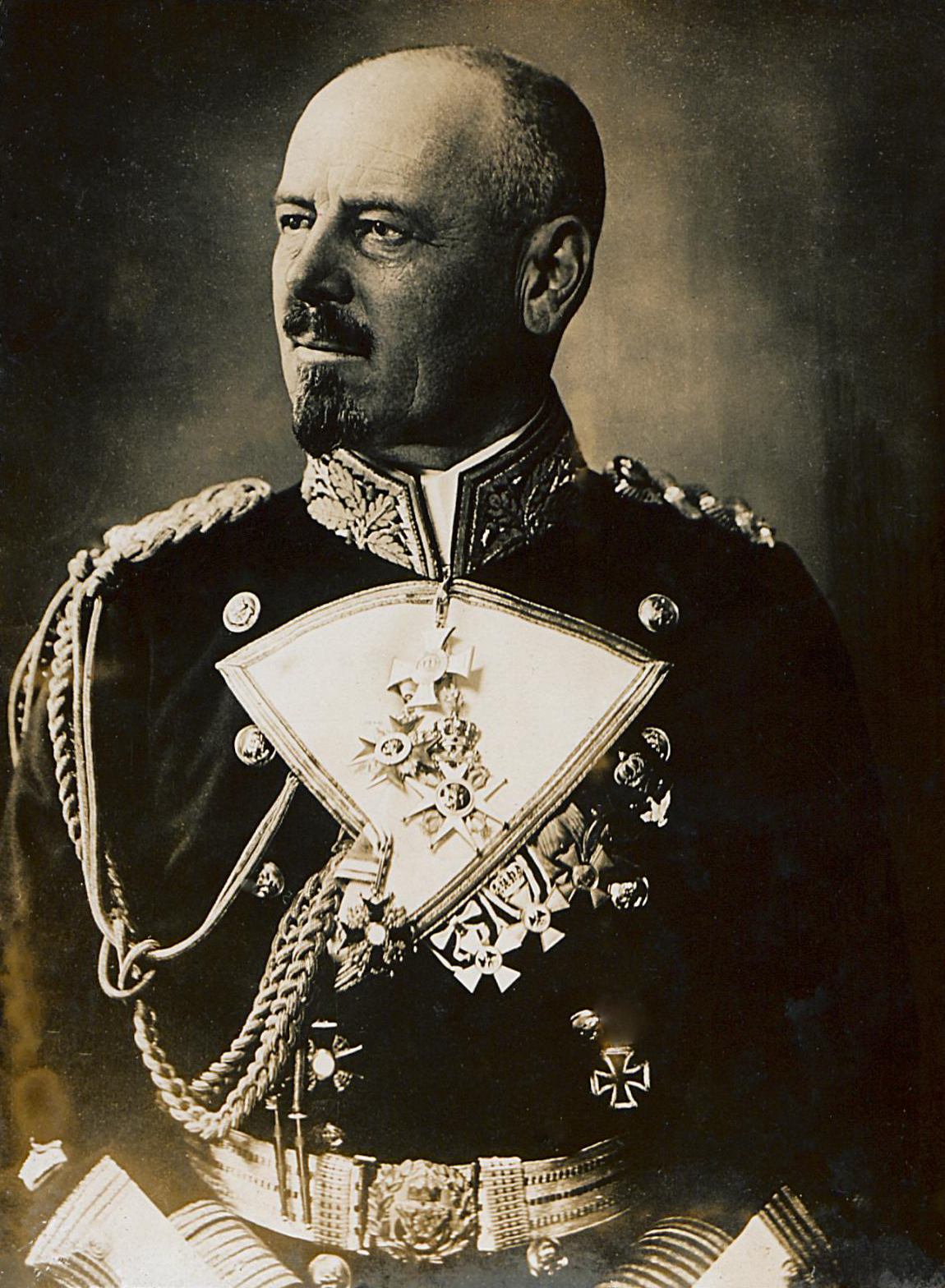
- Von Hipper in 1916
- Born: 13 September 1863; Weilheim in Oberbayern, Bavaria, German Confederation
- Died: 25 May 1932 (aged 68); Othmarschen, Weimar Republic
- Military career
- Allegiance: German Empire
- Branch: Imperial German Navy
- Service years: 1881–1918
- Rank: Admiral
- Commands: Second Torpedo Unit; SMS Leipzig; SMS Friedrich Carl; SMS Gneisenau; First Torpedo Boat Division; SMS Yorck; I Scouting Group; High Seas Fleet
- Conflicts: World War I; Raid on Scarborough, Hartlepool and Whitby; Battle of Dogger Bank; Battle of Jutland
- Awards: See below

Franz von Hipper (born Franz Hipper; 13 September 1863 – 25 May 1932) was an admiral in the German Imperial Navy, (Kaiserliche Marine) who played an important role in the naval warfare of World War I. Franz von Hipper joined the German Navy in 1881 as an officer cadet. He commanded several torpedo boat units and served as watch officer aboard several warships, as well as Kaiser Wilhelm II's yacht SMY Hohenzollern. Hipper commanded several cruisers in the reconnaissance forces before being appointed commander of the I Scouting Group in October 1913.

He is most famous for commanding the German battlecruisers of the I Scouting Group during World War I, particularly at the Battle of Jutland on 31 May – 1 June 1916. During the war, Hipper led the German battlecruisers on several raids of the English coast, for which he was vilified in the English press as a "baby killer". His squadron clashed with the British battlecruiser squadron at the Battle of Dogger Bank in January 1915, where the armored cruiser Blücher was lost. At the Battle of Jutland, Hipper's flagship Lützow was sunk, though his ships succeeded in sinking three British battlecruisers. In 1918, he was promoted to succeed Admiral Reinhard Scheer as commander of the High Seas Fleet.

After the end of the war in 1918, Hipper retired from the Imperial Navy with a full pension. He initially lived under an alias and moved frequently to avoid radical revolutionaries during the German Revolution of 1918–1919. After the revolution settled, he moved to Altona outside Hamburg. Unlike his superior, Reinhard Scheer, he never published a memoir of his service during the war. Hipper died on 25 May 1932. The Kriegsmarine commemorated him with the launching of the heavy cruiser Admiral Hipper in 1938.

== Early life ==
Franz Hipper was born to Anton and Anna Hipper in Weilheim in Oberbayern, some 40 miles (64 km) south of Munich, on 13 September 1863. His father, a shop-keeper, died when Franz was three. When Franz turned five, he began his education at a Catholic grammar school in Munich. At the age of ten, Franz attended the Gymnasium in Munich. Hipper graduated from the Gymnasium in 1879 with the degree of Obersekundareife—the rough equivalent of a high school diploma. (Note: The Obersekundareife was a secondary school graduation that also included the promotion to the educational stage of Obersekunda. The graduate was thus qualified for upper class.)

After completing his education, Hipper signed up as a volunteer reserve officer (Einjährig-Freiwilliger), a one-year volunteer position in the German military. After basic officer training in 1879, Hipper decided to join the navy. He went to Kiel, where he took the Pressen, courses designed to prepare officers for the naval entrance examination, which he successfully passed. On 15 April 1881, at the age of 17, Franz Hipper became an officer of the Imperial German Navy. Among the fellow cadets of the 1881 class was Wilhelm Souchon, who went on to command the Mediterranean Division at the outbreak of World War I.

== Naval career ==
=== Peacetime career ===
After Hipper joined the German Navy in 1881 as a probationary sea cadet, he served on the sail-frigate SMS Niobe from April to September 1881. He was then transferred to the Naval Cadet School in Kiel, which he attended from September 1881 to March 1882. Upon graduation, he attended the 6-week Basic Gunnery School on the training ship Mars, from April to May 1882. Following gunnery training, Hipper was assigned to the training ship Friedrich Carl for sea training, which lasted from May to September 1882. He was then transferred to the steam corvette Leipzig for a world cruise; this was begun in October 1882 and completed two years later in October 1884. Upon reaching Germany, Hipper returned to Kiel to attend Naval Officer School from November 1884 to April 1885. On 24 April, Hipper was assigned as a divisional drill officer; he was tasked with training recruits for the First Naval Battalion, based in Kiel. Hipper held this position for seven months.

In October 1885, Hipper went through the Executive Officer School in Kiel, which he completed on 16 December. On 4 January 1886, Hipper was assigned as a division officer for the Second Seaman's Artillery Division, Coastal Defense Artillery. He remained in this post until 3 March 1887, at which point he was assigned as the watch officer aboard Friedrich Carl. This began a three-and-a-half-year stint serving as watch officer aboard several ships, including the corvettes Stosch and Stein, the armored frigate Friedrich der Grosse, and the aviso Wacht. Hipper attended the Torpedo Officer Course aboard the corvette Blücher from October 1890 to January 1891. He was then designated as a torpedo specialist; he returned to Friedrich der Grosse as a torpedo officer in October 1891. In April 1892, he went to join the crew of the newly commissioned coastal defense ship Beowulf, again as a torpedo officer. He served in this position only briefly, before being reassigned as the company commander of the Second Torpedo Unit, based in Wilhelmshaven, in October 1892. Hipper then took part in torpedo boat instruction from January to February 1893.

In 1894–95, Hipper served as the senior watch officer aboard the new battleship Wörth, under the command of Prince Heinrich. While aboard Wörth, Hipper was promoted to Senior Lieutenant and awarded the Bavarian National Defense Service Medal on 29 August 1895. In September 1895, Hipper was assigned as the commanding officer of the Second Torpedo-boat Reserve Division. He held this position for 21 months, during which time he alternated command of four vessels of the active and reserve units in his division. In June 1897, Hipper participated in a 17-day Admiralty staff cruise aboard the aviso Grille. After returning from the staff cruise, Hipper was promoted to serve as the commander of the Second Reserve Torpedo-boat Flotilla, a position in which he served for 15 months.

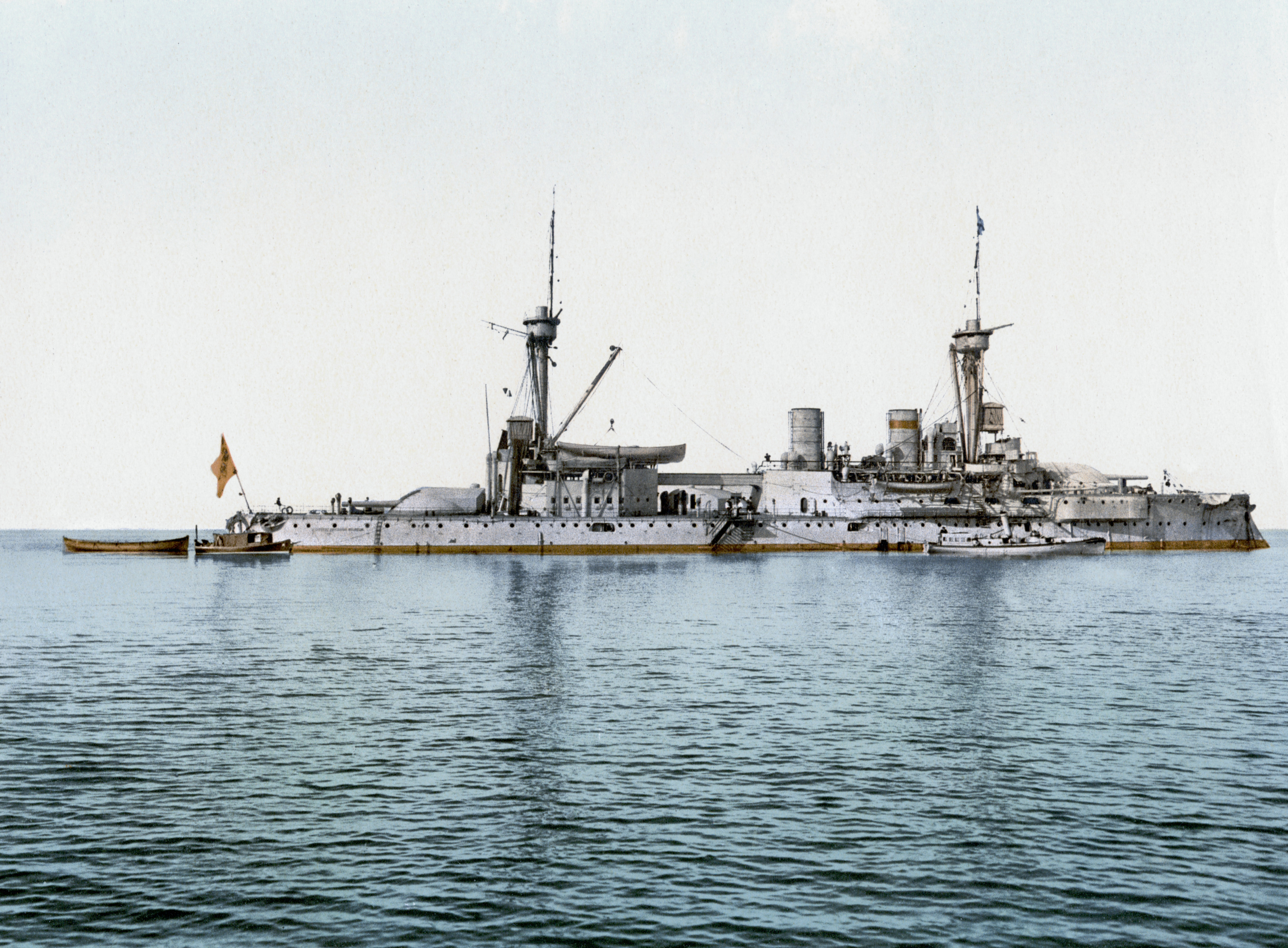
SMS Kurfürst Friedrich Wilhelm

Hipper was transferred to the battleship Kurfürst Friedrich Wilhelm on 1 October 1898, where he served as navigator. Hipper served for 11 months as navigator aboard the battleship before he was transferred to the Imperial yacht SMY Hohenzollern on 19 September 1899. While serving on the Imperial yacht, Hipper was present for the trip to England for Queen Victoria's funeral in 1901 and the cruise to America the following year. Hipper was awarded a number of medals during his service aboard Hohenzollern, including the Prussian Order of the Red Eagle, the Bavarian Military Service Order, and the Order of St. Stanislaus—awarded by the Tsar Nicholas II of Russia. Hipper was promoted to the rank of Korvettenkapitän (corvette captain) on 10 June 1901.

After leaving the Imperial yacht, Hipper was assigned to command of the Second Torpedo Unit on 1 October 1902. He held the command until 30 September 1905. His flagship for the first six months of his command was the new cruiser Niobe; he then transferred his flag to the large torpedo boat D8. While in this command, Hipper was awarded additional commendations, including the Prussian Distinguished Service Cross and the Prussian Royal Crown Order. He was promoted to the rank of Fregattenkapitän (frigate captain) on 5 April. In January 1906, Hipper attended the 10-day Cruiser Gunnery School on the new armored cruiser Prinz Adalbert. In April 1906, he participated in the Battleship Gunnery Course conducted aboard the battleship Schwaben. On 20 April, Hipper was given command of the light cruiser Leipzig, though his tenure as commander was short-lived. Leipzig departed for the East Asia Squadron in September 1906, at which point Hipper was transferred to command the new armored cruiser Friedrich Carl. Hipper assumed command of the ship on 30 September. Under Hipper's leadership, the crew of Friedrich Carl won the Kaiser's Prize for the best shooting in the fleet in 1907. Admiral Hugo von Pohl stated in a subsequent report:

"He has brought the ship to a higher degree of combat effectiveness, and the ship has won the Kaiser Prize for good shooting. One of the best captains we have in the cruisers. A good example for his officers. Recommended for battleship command and for higher independent commands."

On 6 April 1907, Hipper was promoted to Kapitän zur See (captain at sea). Nicholas II awarded Hipper another commendation, the Order of St. Andrew, that year during a meeting with Wilhelm II. During the ceremony, Hipper joined Wilhelm II as one of his "Imperial Captains." On 6 March 1908, Hipper took command of the new cruiser Gneisenau. He was tasked with conducting the shakedown cruise, after which the ship departed for the East Asia Squadron. Hipper again remained in Germany; he was given command of the First Torpedo boat Division, based in Kiel. Here he was responsible for training more than half of the torpedo boats in the entire German navy. Hipper held the position for three years, until he returned to fleet service.

On 1 October 1911, Hipper took command of the armored cruiser Yorck, along with the position as chief of staff for Rear Admiral Gustav Bachmann, the Deputy Flag Officer, Reconnaissance Forces. In January 1912, Rear Admiral Bachmann was promoted out of his position; on the 26th Hipper succeeded him as the deputy commander. The following day, he was promoted to rear admiral. After serving as the deputy commander for over a year and a half, Hipper again followed Admiral Bachmann. Admiral Bachmann was promoted to Chief of the Baltic Station and Hipper took over as the commanding officer of the I Scouting Group on 1 October 1913. Erich Raeder was appointed as Hipper's deputy.

=== World War I ===
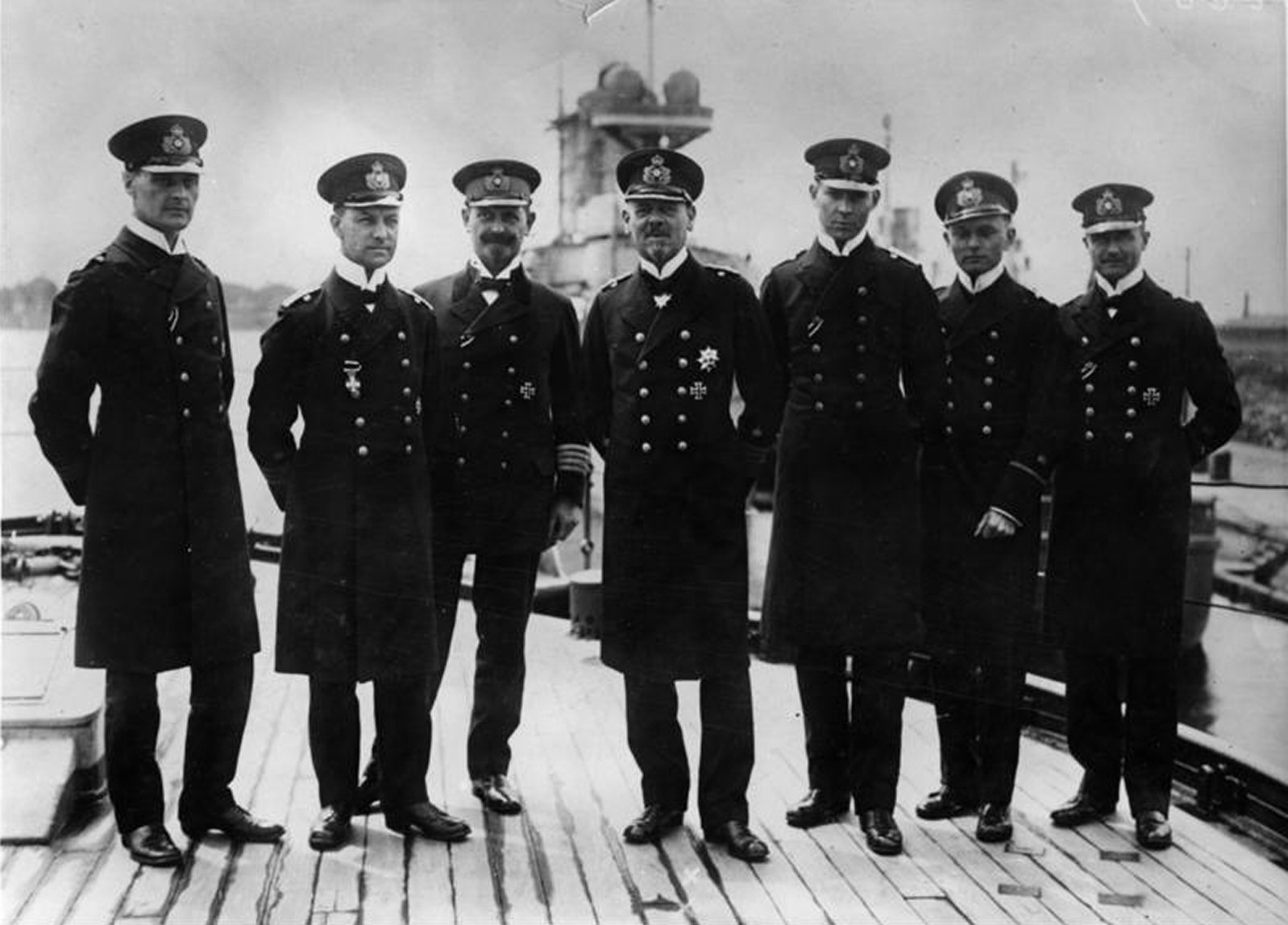
Admiral Hipper (center) with his staff in 1916. Second from left: Erich Raeder, the future Großadmiral during World War II.

After World War I broke out in 1914 Hipper led his battlecruisers on several raids against the English coastal towns. The first such raid occurred on 2 November 1914. Hipper's force included the battlecruisers Moltke, Von der Tann, and Seydlitz, his flagship, and the large armored cruiser Blücher, along with four light cruisers. The flotilla arrived off Great Yarmouth at daybreak the following morning and bombarded the port, while the light cruiser Stralsund laid a minefield. The British submarine HMS D5 responded to the bombardment, but struck one of the mines laid by Stralsund and sank. Shortly thereafter, Hipper ordered his ships to turn back to German waters. On the way, a heavy fog covered the Heligoland Bight, so the ships were ordered to halt until visibility improved and they could safely navigate the defensive minefields. The armored cruiser Yorck made a navigational error that led her into one of the German minefields. She struck two mines and quickly sank; only 127 men out of the crew of 629 were rescued.

A second operation followed on 15–16 December 1914; it targeted the towns of Scarborough, Hartlepool, and Whitby. By this time Hipper's squadron had been augmented by the new battlecruiser Derfflinger. Twelve hours after Hipper left the Jade, the High Seas Fleet, consisting of 14 dreadnoughts and 8 pre-dreadnoughts and a screening force of 2 armored cruisers, 7 light cruisers, and 54 torpedo boats, departed to provide distant cover for the bombardment force. The Royal Navy had the capability to intercept and decode the German naval code, as a result of the capture of the light cruiser Magdeburg at the outbreak of the war. On 14 December, the British intercepted messages relating to the plan to bombard Scarborough. Vice Admiral Beatty's four battlecruisers, supported by six dreadnoughts and several cruisers and smaller vessels, were to ambush Hipper's battlecruisers.

The evening of the 15th, the main German fleet encountered the six British battleships; Admiral Friedrich von Ingenohl, convinced he was faced by the entire British fleet, turned in retreat. Hipper was unaware of his superior's decision, and so pressed on with the bombardment. The three towns were shelled briefly before Hipper turned back to the planned rendezvous point. By this time, Beatty's battlecruisers were in position to block Hipper's chosen egress route, while other forces were en route to complete the encirclement. Errors in signaling aboard the British ships and bad weather, however, allowed Hipper to escape the trap without incident. As a result of the civilian casualties inflicted in these raids, the British propaganda effort vilified Hipper as a "baby killer."

==== Battle of Dogger Bank ====
In early January 1915, it became known to the German naval command that British ships were conducting reconnaissance in the Dogger Bank area. Admiral Ingenohl was initially reluctant to attempt to destroy these forces, because the I Scouting Group was temporarily weakened while Von der Tann was in drydock for periodic maintenance. Rear Admiral (German: Konteradmiral) Richard Eckermann, the Chief of Staff of the High Seas Fleet, insisted on the operation, and so Ingenohl relented and ordered Hipper to take his battlecruisers to the Dogger Bank. On 23 January, Hipper sortied, with Seydlitz in the lead, followed by Moltke, Derfflinger, and Blücher, along with four light cruisers and 19 torpedo boats.

Again, interception and decryption of German wireless signals played an important role. Although they were unaware of the exact plans, the cryptographers of Room 40 were able to deduce that Hipper would be conducting an operation in the Dogger Bank area. Vice Admiral Beatty was again tasked with intercepting and destroying Hipper's battlecruisers. At 08:14 on 24 January, the German cruiser Kolberg spotted the light cruiser Aurora and several destroyers from the Harwich Force, which had been attached to support Beatty's battlecruiser squadron. Hipper immediately turned his battlecruisers towards the gunfire, when, almost simultaneously, Stralsund spotted a large amount of smoke to the northwest of her position. This was identified as a number of large British warships steaming towards Hipper's ships. Hipper later remarked:

"The presence of such a large force indicated the proximity of further sections of the British Fleet, especially as wireless intercepts revealed the approach of 2nd Battlecruiser Squadron... They were also reported by Blücher at the rear of the German line, which had opened fire on a light cruiser and several destroyers coming up from astern... The battlecruisers under my command found themselves, in view of the prevailing [East-North-East] wind, in the windward position and so in an unfavourable situation from the outset."

Hipper turned south to flee, but was limited to 23 knots (43 km/h; 26 mph), which was Blücher's maximum speed at the time. (Note: Throughout the war, the German Navy suffered from a chronic shortage of high-quality coal. As a result, the ships' engines could not operate at maximum performance. For example, at the Battle of Jutland, the battlecruiser SMS Von der Tann, which had a maximum speed of 27.5 knots (50.9 km/h; 31.6 mph), was limited to 18 knots (33 km/h; 21 mph) for a significant length of time due to this problem. See: Philbin, pp. 56–57) The pursuing British battlecruisers were steaming at 27 knots (50 km/h; 31 mph), and quickly caught up to the German ships. As the rearmost ship in the German line, Blücher suffered the majority of the British gunfire for the early portion of the battle.

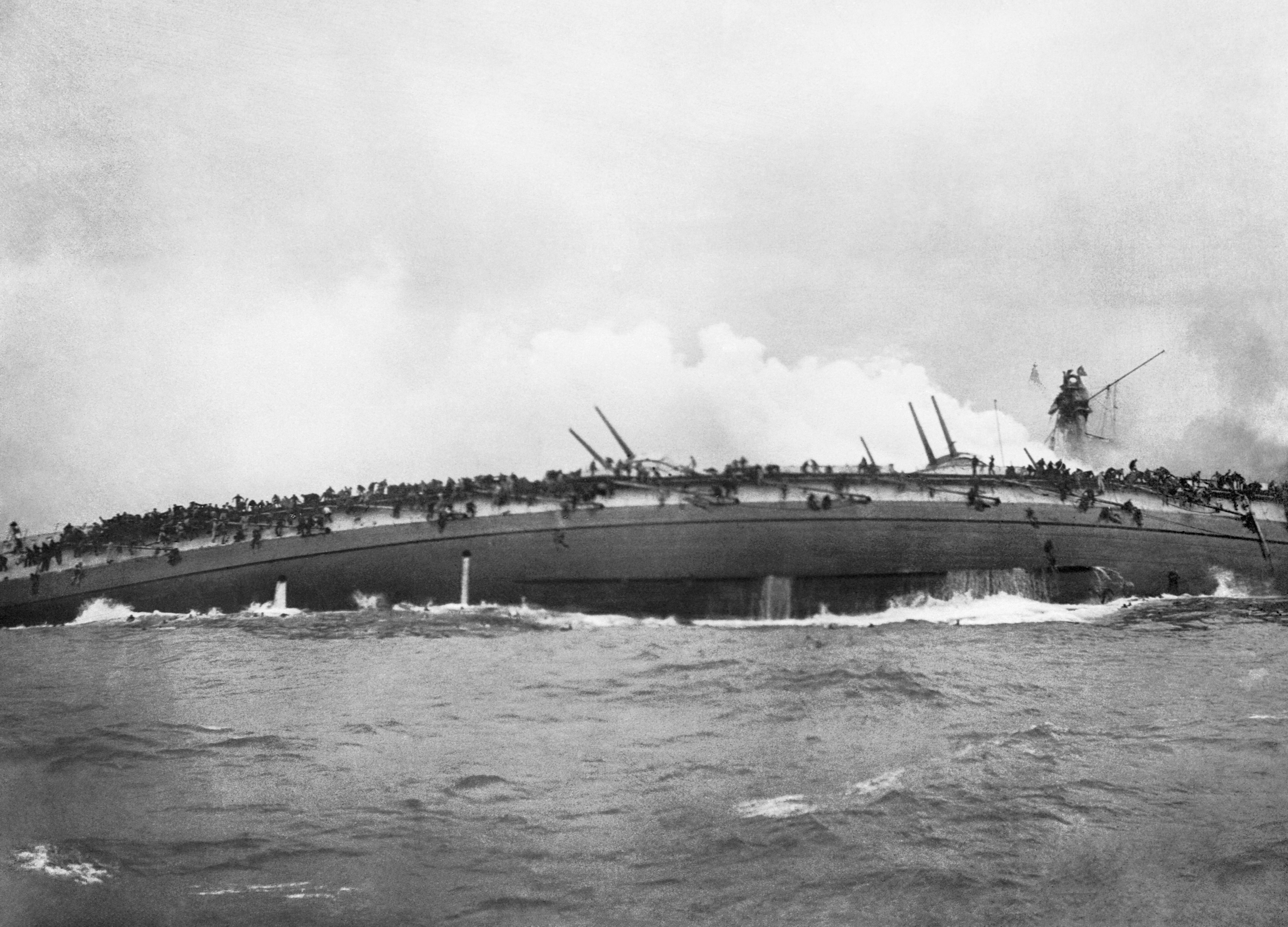
The sinking Blücher rolls over on her side

Seydlitz was struck in her forecastle at 10:25, by a 13.5 in shell from Lion, but this hit did minor damage. At 10:40, Lion hit Seydlitz with a single 13.5 in (343 mm) shell, which holed the deck and penetrated the rear barbette. The shell itself failed to enter the barbette, but the explosion flashed into the working chamber and detonated the propellant charges inside. By this time, Blücher was severely damaged after having been pounded by heavy shells. The chase ended when there were several reports of U-boats ahead of the British ships; Beatty quickly ordered evasive maneuvers, which allowed the German ships to increase the distance to their pursuers. At this time, Lion's last operational dynamo failed, which dropped her speed to 15 knots (28 km/h). Beatty, in the stricken Lion, ordered the remaining battlecruisers to "Engage the enemy's rear," but signal confusion caused the ships to solely target Blücher, allowing Moltke, Seydlitz, and Derfflinger to escape.

Blame for the loss of Blücher was not placed on Hipper, but on his superior Admiral Ingenohl, who was removed from his post on 4 February. Also on the 4th, Hipper met with the Kaiser on an inspection of the fleet in Wilhelmshaven. That same day, Hipper was awarded the Iron Cross by the Kaiser; on the 23rd he was presented with the Friedrich August Cross, First and Second Classes, by the Grand Duke of Oldenburg. Three days later, Hipper was informed that his hometown had named its main street Hipperstrasse (Hipper Street).

By March 1916, Hipper suffered from severe combat fatigue; he had held command of the fleet reconnaissance forces for some 20 months, and the strain of command was beginning to take its toll. He requested sick leave on 20 March, which was approved by Admiral Reinhard Scheer—who had replaced Pohl as fleet commander in January 1916— a week later on the 27th. Scheer, however, attempted to have Hipper retired instead of returning after the termination of sick leave; he contacted Henning von Holtzendorff, the Chief of the Admiralty Staff, who disagreed with Scheer. Holtzendorff thought that relieving Hipper at that point would "only damage the war leadership." Hipper had meanwhile left for a spa in Bad Nenndorf, where he spent five weeks. His deputy, Friedrich Boedicker, assumed temporary command. Hipper returned to his post on 12 May 1916; he hoisted his flag aboard the newly commissioned battlecruiser Lützow.

==== Battle of Jutland ====
Admiral Scheer planned another operation to lure out a portion of the British fleet for 17 May, but damage to the battlecruiser SMS Seydlitz sustained during the bombardment of Yarmouth and Lowestoft the previous month, coupled with condenser trouble on several of the battleships of III Battle Squadron caused the plan to be delayed, ultimately to 31 May. That morning, at 02:00 CET, the I Scouting Group, which comprised the battlecruisers Lützow, Derfflinger, Seydlitz, Moltke, and Von der Tann, five light cruisers, and 30 torpedo boats, left the Jade estuary. Scheer and the battle fleet followed an hour and a half later. The British navy's Room 40 had intercepted and decrypted German radio traffic containing plans of the operation, and so sortied the Grand Fleet, totaling some 28 dreadnoughts and 9 battlecruisers the night before, in order to cut off and destroy the High Seas Fleet.

At 16:00, the British and German battlecruiser forces encountered each other and began a running gun fight south, back towards Scheer's battle fleet. During this portion of the battle, Hipper's ships destroyed the battlecruisers Indefatigable and Queen Mary. Upon reaching the High Seas Fleet, Vice Admiral David Beatty's battlecruisers turned back to the north to lure the Germans towards the rapidly approaching Grand Fleet, under the command of Admiral John Jellicoe. During the run to the north, Hipper's ships continued to engage both Beatty's battlecruisers and the Queen Elizabeth-class battleships of the 5th Battle Squadron.

At 19:24, the 3rd Battlecruiser Squadron had formed up with Beatty's remaining battlecruisers ahead of the German line. The leading British ships spotted Lützow and Derfflinger, and began firing on them. In the span of 8 minutes, the battlecruiser Invincible scored eight hits on Lützow; these hits were mainly concentrated in the ship's bow and were the primary cause of the flooding that would eventually cause her loss. In return, both Lützow and Derfflinger concentrated their fire on Invincible, and at 19:33, Lützow's third salvo penetrated Invincible's center turret and ignited the magazine; the ship disappeared in a series of massive explosions.

By 19:30, the Grand Fleet had arrived on the scene, and was deployed into a position that would cross Scheer's "T" from the northeast. To extricate his fleet from this precarious position, Scheer ordered a 16-point turn to the south-west. Lützow had lost speed and was unable to keep up, and so Hipper ordered his flagship to withdraw to the southwest. Shortly before 20:00, Kommodore Michelson, aboard the cruiser Rostock, dispatched the torpedo boats of I Half-Flotilla to assist Lützow. G39 came alongside and took Hipper and his staff aboard, in order to transfer him to one of the other battlecruisers. At 19:55, Scheer decided to conduct another 16-point turn to launch an attack on the British fleet. This maneuver again put Scheer in a dangerous position; Jellicoe had turned his fleet south and again crossed Scheer's "T." A third 16-point turn followed, which was covered by a charge by Hipper's mauled battlecruisers—though as he was in the process of transferring from Lützow to G39, command of the squadron had temporarily fallen to Captain Hartog aboard Derfflinger. Hipper remarked,

"I had to find myself another flagship because I could no longer exercise command from one which was shot to pieces...A torpedo boat was called alongside and we changed under heavy fire...[I] drove my torpedoboat hoping to find an advantageous moment to board one of [the other battlecruisers]. These 1½ hours that I spent in a hail of shell and splinters aboard the torpedoboat I shall not be likely to forget."

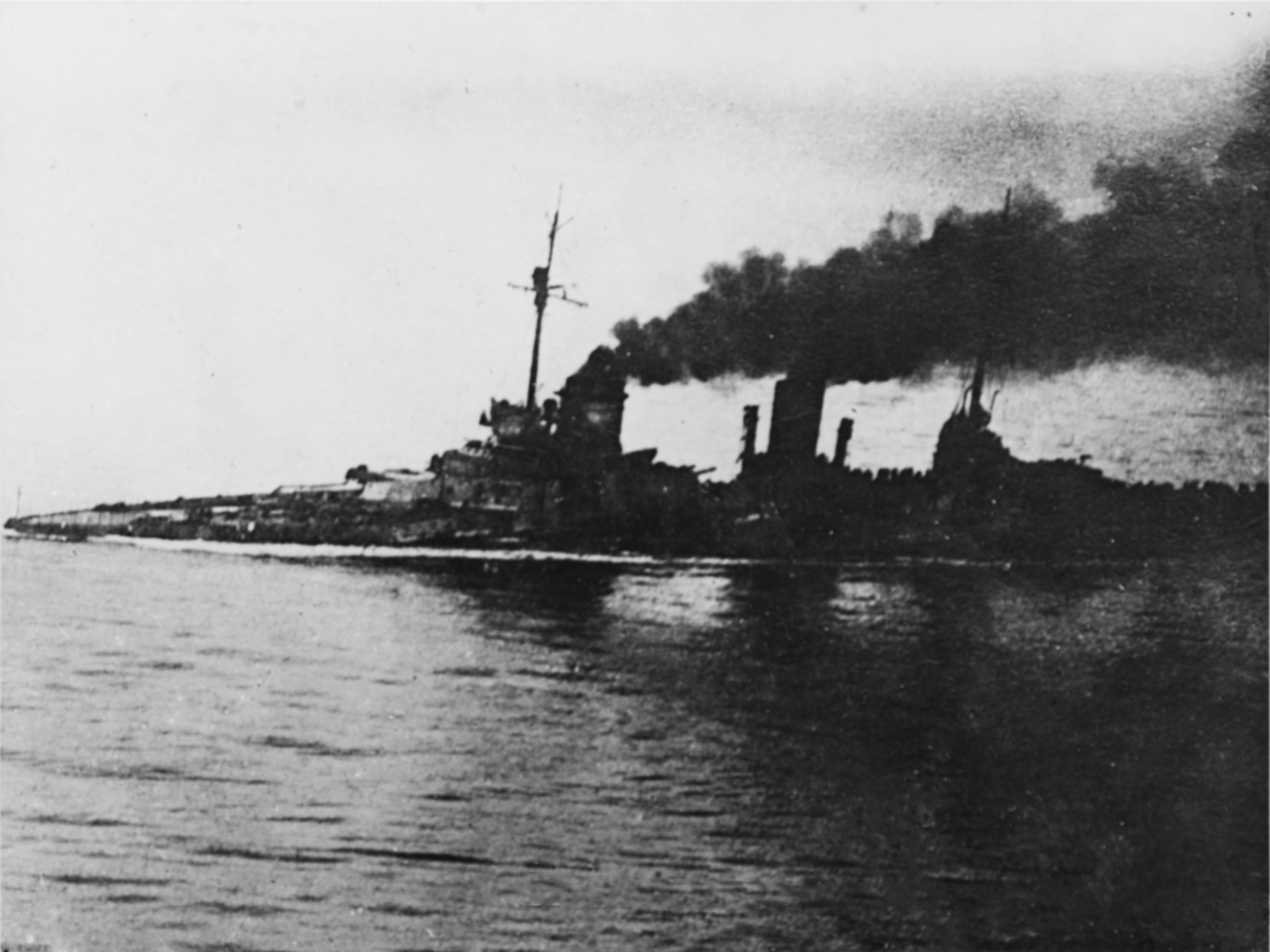
Seydlitz; heavily damaged during the battle of Jutland and attempting to limp home

By 22:15, Hipper was finally able to transfer to Moltke; he then ordered his ships to steam at 20 knots (37 km/h; 23 mph) to take up their station at the head of the German line. Only Moltke and Seydlitz, however, were in condition to comply; Derfflinger and Von der Tann could make at most 18 knots, and so these ships lagged behind. An attack by British light cruisers caused the German formation to fall into disarray. In the confusion, Seydlitz lost sight of Moltke, and was no longer able to keep up with Moltke's 22 knots (41 km/h; 25 mph); Seydlitz detached herself to proceed to the Horns Reef lighthouse independently. Hipper's ships were to see no further combat during the return to German waters; at 03:55 Hipper reported to Scheer that Derfflinger and Von der Tann both had only two guns in operation, and that Seydlitz had been heavily damaged. Scheer replied that Hipper was to return to Wilhelmshaven while the fleet stood off Horns Reef.

For his conduct in the battle, Hipper received Germany's highest military honor, the Pour le Mérite; it was awarded by the Kaiser on 5 June. He was also awarded the Royal Bavarian Military Order of Max Joseph, Commander's Cross. This award carried with it elevation to the nobility and the title Ritter. He was presented with several other awards, including the Royal Saxon Order, the Order of Albrecht, and all three Hanseatic Crosses from Lübeck, Bremen, and Hamburg.

==== Command of the High Seas Fleet ====
Franz von Hipper

Commander of High Seas Fleet
- In office August 1918 – November 1918
- Preceded by: Reinhard Scheer
- Succeeded by: position abolished

The remainder of 1916 and through 1917 was largely uneventful for Hipper. He was placed in command of a detachment of the High Seas Fleet, composed of two battlecruisers, eleven battleships, four light cruisers, and twelve torpedo boats, sent to Denmark to retrieve a pair of stranded U-boats in November 1916. One was successfully returned to Germany, but the other had to be destroyed to prevent its capture. On the return to Germany, Kronprinz and Grosser Kurfürst were torpedoed by a British submarine. A year later, a brief skirmish took place in the Helgoland Bight between British and German capital ships.

On 12 August 1918, Hipper was promoted to command of the High Seas Fleet, after Scheer had been promoted to the Chief of Naval Staff. He was concurrently promoted to Admiral; Hipper took provisional control of the fleet in a ceremony held on the old battleship Kaiser Wilhelm II the day before. However, the war was all but lost by the time Hipper took command of the fleet.

In October, Hipper and Scheer envisioned one last major fleet advance to attack the British Grand Fleet. Scheer intended to inflict as much damage as possible on the British navy, to achieve a better bargaining position for Germany regardless of the cost to the navy. During the planning stages, Hipper wrote "As to a battle for the honor of the fleet in this war, even if it were a death battle, it would be the foundation for a new German fleet...such a fleet would be out of the question in the event of a dishonorable peace." The plan involved two simultaneous attacks by light cruisers and destroyers, one on Flanders and another on shipping in the Thames estuary; the five battlecruisers were to support the Thames attack while the dreadnoughts remained off Flanders. After both strikes, the fleet was to concentrate off the Dutch coast, where it would meet the Grand Fleet in battle.

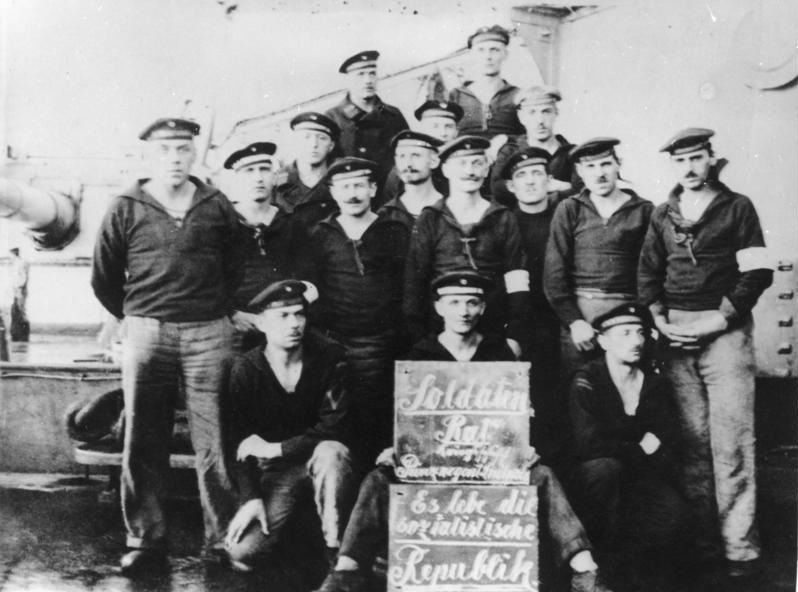
Members of the soldiers council of the battleship Prinzregent Luitpold

While the fleet was consolidating in Wilhelmshaven, however, war-weary sailors began deserting en masse. As Von der Tann and Derfflinger passed through the locks that separated Wilhelmshaven's inner harbor and roadstead, some 300 men from both ships climbed over the side and disappeared ashore. On 24 October 1918, the order was given to sail from Wilhelmshaven. Starting on the night of 29 October, sailors on several battleships mutinied; three ships from the III Squadron refused to weigh anchors, and acts of sabotage were committed on board the battleships Thüringen and Helgoland. In the face of open rebellion, the order to sail was rescinded and the planned operation was abandoned. In an attempt to suppress the mutiny, the High Seas Fleet squadrons were dispersed. The situation had declined so significantly that on 9 November, Hipper personally took down his flag from the battleship Baden and went ashore.

According to the terms of the Armistice, all five of Germany's battlecruisers and two of the three battle squadrons, along with a number of light cruisers and the most modern torpedo boats, were to be interned in Scapa Flow. The fleet was placed under the command of Rear Admiral Ludwig von Reuter and sent to meet the Allied fleet of some 370 vessels. Hipper watched from shore as the German fleet left for Scapa Flow on 21 November 1918. He later wrote,

My heart is breaking with this; my time as fleet commander has come to an inglorious end. The remaining questions of demobilization, disarmament, and the negotiations with the soldiers councils can be handled by my chief of staff; I have nothing more to do. I shall remain pro forma in command for a short time, otherwise, I am dead tired.

Less than two weeks later, on 2 December, Admiral Hipper submitted his request to be placed on the inactive list. He retired on 13 December with a full pension; at the age of 55, Hipper had spent almost 37 years on active duty in the Imperial Navy. Barely six months later, the German fleet in Scapa Flow was scuttled by its crew on 21 June 1919.

== Post-war life ==
Following the German defeat in World War I, Hipper retired on 13 December 1918 from the navy and lived a quiet life; he received a full war pension. During the chaos of the German revolution of 1918–1919, Hipper hid from radical revolutionaries by assuming a false name and moving frequently. He wrote a letter to Adolf von Trotha, the new fleet commander, expressing his approval of the scuttling of the German fleet at Scapa Flow on 21 June 1919. After the revolution was over, Hipper moved to a house in Altona near Hamburg.

Unlike his superior, Reinhard Scheer, Hipper never wrote a memoir of the war or his participation in the Imperial Navy. He briefly dabbled in conservative political movements in the 1920s but never committed to any. He died on 25 May 1932; he was cremated and was buried in his hometown of Weilheim, according to his wishes. On hearing of Hipper's death, his old adversary David Beatty said, "I am very sorry. One would like to express one's regrets for the passing of a gallant officer and a great sailor." In 1938, the German navy, which had been expanded by the Nazis, launched the new heavy cruiser Admiral Hipper in commemoration of its namesake.

== Decorations and awards ==
- Iron Cross of 1914, 1st and 2nd class
- Pour le Mérite (5 June 1916)
- Order of the Red Eagle, 2nd class with Star, Oak Leaves and Swords
- Order of the Crown, 2nd class (Prussia)
- Service Award (Prussia)
- Commander's Cross of the Military Order of Max Joseph (6 June 1916) (Bavaria)
- Military Merit Order, 2nd class with Star and Swords (Bavaria)
- Commander's Cross First Class with Swords of the Albert Order (Saxony)
- Commander of the Military Merit Order (Württemberg)
- Military Merit Cross, 1st class (Mecklenburg-Schwerin)
- Friedrich August Cross, 1st class (Oldenburg)
- Knight's Cross, First Class of the Order of the White Falcon (Weimar)
- Hanseatic Crosses of Bremen, Hamburg and Lübeck
- Commander of the Order of St. Olav (Norway)
- Various naval warships and shore installations were named for Hipper: heavy cruiser Admiral Hipper of the Kriegsmarine, the training frigate Hipper of the Bundesmarine and a building of the German Naval Operations School in Bremerhaven.

== Notes ==
Footnotes

Citations

Political offices
Preceded by Reinhard Scheer	Commander-in-Chief of High Seas Fleet of the Imperial German Navy; August–November 1918	Succeeded by Ludwig von Reuter
