= German High Command =

German High Command may refer to:

- German Imperial Naval High Command (Kaiserliches Oberkommando der Marine)
- Oberste Heeresleitung (OHL, "Supreme Army Command") of the German Empire
- Oberkommando der Wehrmacht (OKW, "Supreme Command of the Armed Forces") of Nazi Germany
  - Oberkommando des Heeres (OKH, "Supreme Command of the Army") of Nazi Germany
  - Oberkommando der Luftwaffe (OKL, "Supreme Command of the Air Force") of Nazi Germany
  - Oberkommando der Marine (OKM, "Supreme Command of the Navy") of Nazi Germany
