= Hugo von Pohl =

German admiral (1855–1916)

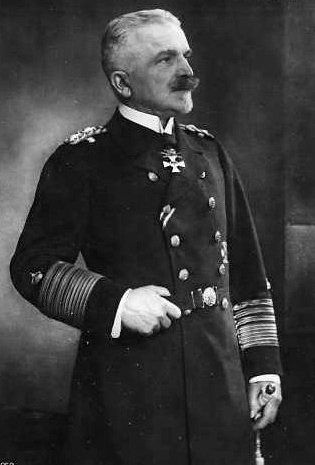
- Hugo von Pohl, 1915
- Born: 25 August 1855; Breslau, Province of Silesia, Kingdom of Prussia (now Wrocław, Poland)
- Died: 23 February 1916 (aged 60)
- Military career
- Allegiance: German Empire
- Branch: Imperial German Navy
- Service years: 1876–1916
- Rank: Admiral
- Commands: SMS Carola; SMS Ulan; SMS Hansa; SMS Elsaß; Reconnaissance Forces; High Seas Fleet
- Conflicts: Boxer Rebellion; First World War

Hugo von Pohl (25 August 1855 – 23 February 1916) was a German admiral who served during the First World War. He joined the Navy in 1872 and served in various capacities, including with the new torpedo boats in the 1880s, and in the Reichsmarineamt (Imperial Navy Office) in the 1890s. He eventually reached the rank of Vizeadmiral and held the position of Chief of the Admiralty Staff in 1913. As Chief of the Admiralty Staff, Pohl was an outspoken advocate of unrestricted submarine warfare, and he put the policy into effect as he left the post on 1 February 1915.

He commanded the German High Seas Fleet from February 1915 until January 1916. As the commander of the surface fleet, he was exceedingly cautious, and did not engage the High Seas Fleet in any actions with the British Grand Fleet. Seriously ill from liver cancer by January 1916, Pohl was replaced by Reinhard Scheer that month. Pohl died a month later.

== Biography ==
=== Early career ===
Hugo von Pohl was born in Breslau, Prussian Silesia, on 25 August 1855. He entered the Kaiserliche Marine (Imperial Navy) as a cadet in April 1872. At the age of 24, Pohl was promoted and given command of the sailing corvette SMS Carola. In the 1880s, he served with then-Korvettenkapitän Alfred von Tirpitz in his so-called "Torpedo Gang", which advocated a greater emphasis on torpedo boats in the German fleet. Pohl took command of the spar torpedo vessel Ulan, an early, experimental torpedo boat, in 1882. Two years later, in late September 1884, he was involved in an experiment with new torpedo boat designs from Schichau, Thornycroft, AG Vulcan, and AG Weser; Pohl commanded one of the Schichau boats. During the exercises, Pohl's boat collided with the boat commanded by August von Heeringen. The former's boat sprang a leak, while the latter's rudder was damaged, but both safely returned to port.

By the 1890s, Pohl had been transferred to the Reichsmarineamt (Imperial Navy Office), where he would again work with Tirpitz after the latter was appointed as the State Secretary of the Navy. In 1900, Pohl was assigned to the fleet that was sent to China to help suppress the Boxer Uprising. While in China, he commanded the protected cruiser SMS Hansa, which bombarded the Taku Forts. In May of that year, Pohl was promoted to Korvettenkapitän. He was promoted to the rank of Konteradmiral in 1906. Thereafter he served as the commander of the reconnaissance forces of the German fleet. Pohl was promoted again, to Vizeadmiral, in January 1913. That year, he was elevated to the nobility and, in April, became the Chief of the Admiralty Staff, a position he would hold for two years.

As Chief of the Admiralty Staff, Pohl was involved in the German deliberations during the July Crisis in the aftermath of the assassination of Archduke Franz Ferdinand by Serbian terrorists the previous month. Pohl, Helmuth von Moltke, the Chief of the German General Staff, and Theobald von Bethmann Hollweg, the Chancellor, met the Kaiser after the monarch returned from a cruise to Norway with the bulk of the High Seas Fleet. Pohl and the others were present at several meetings with the Kaiser, which ultimately produced the "blank check" Wilhelm II extended to Austria-Hungary; this decision ultimately helped to push Europe into the First World War by the end of the month.

=== First World War ===
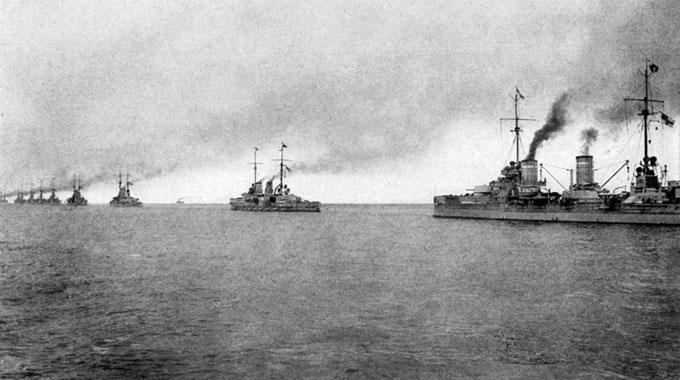
The dreadnoughts of the High Seas Fleet steaming in line

At the outbreak of war, Pohl, along with Georg von Müller, the Chief of the Imperial Naval Cabinet, and Friedrich von Ingenohl, the commander of the High Seas Fleet, believed that, since the war would be over quickly, the fleet should be preserved intact. Together, they agreed that the fleet should be restrained to provide local defense of the German coast, rather than seek a decisive battle against the numerically superior British Grand Fleet. Pohl argued that U-boats should be used to attack British merchant shipping. He pushed for fewer restrictions on the conduct of the commerce war beginning in late 1914; he further advocated abandoning the cruiser rules that handicapped the German effort, in favor of unrestricted submarine warfare. He presented his first plans for an unlimited commerce war in November 1914, but these were rejected by the Kaiser and Bethmann Hollweg so as not to antagonize neutral nations, in particular the United States.

After the Battle of Dogger Bank, Pohl was chosen to replace Ingenohl as commander of the High Seas Fleet. As he was leaving the post of Chief of the Admiralty Staff, on February 1 he successfully negotiated with Bethmann Hollweg to begin a campaign of unrestricted submarine warfare, promising extravagantly that a fleet of twenty submarines would be sufficient and a deterrent effect would cause neutral shipping to cease, and thus cause no diplomatic issues. Breaching protocol by not consulting with the Secretary of State of the Imperial Naval Office (Tirpitz) or the Chief of the Naval Cabinet (Müller), Pohl thus presented his successor Gustav Bachmann with a fait accompli, which he made public on taking on his new role as Commander-in-Chief of the High Seas Fleet, on 4 February 1915.

Pohl did the honours as Commander-in-Chief, in which capacity he reported to the Kaiser. Aboard the tug, from the yard to the Seydlitz, which had suffered heavy damage on the 24th January in the Battle of the Dogger Bank, he gave the Kaiser details of the U-boat blockade against English which, unknown to me, had been agreed with the Chancellor, apparently on the strength of State-Secretary Delbrück who had declared that in an emergency we could also feed the Belgians (7 millions) until the next harvest. The whole matter was proof of the inadequacy of the Chancellor and of the personal ambition of von Pohl, who at the start of his new career as Commander-in-Chief wished to show off with this piece of pirate bravado. During the conversation, I happened to be below in the little cabin and could not hear the gist of Pohl's speech from the stern, otherwise I should have intervened very energetically in this brow-beating of the Kaiser. Tirpitz who was standing next to him could have done this himself.

— Diary of Admiral Georg von Müller

In further internal discussions between the Admiralty, the Chancellor and the Kaiser, the campaign was moderated to one against enemy vessels only with neutral vessels excluded. Tirpitz and Bachmann were furious as the navy was not prepared to launch the campaign, but they now had to defend a policy they were not consulted on to the Kaiser. The policy soon caused a diplomatic crisis, as on 7 May 1915, the U-boat U-20 torpedoed and sank the passenger liner RMS Lusitania. With further sinkings, to avoid drawing America into the war, Germany reinstated restrictions on the U-boat fleet, first secretly, then publicly.

As High Seas Fleet commander, Pohl adopted a very cautious strategy in order to preserve the strength of the surface fleet. Aboard his flagship, SMS Friedrich der Grosse, Pohl conducted a series of short operations into the North Sea over the course of 1915. None of these operations ventured outside the southern end of the North Sea, and the fleet never encountered any British forces. Pohl became seriously ill from liver cancer on 8 January 1916 and was taken to a hospital ship. He was subsequently moved to Berlin for surgery. He was relieved of command due to his poor health on 23 January; his replacement as fleet commander was Reinhard Scheer. Pohl died a month later, on 23 February. Shortly before his death, he was awarded the Order of the Red Eagle with oak leaves and swords for his command of the fleet. In 1920, Pohl's widow Ella published some of his papers in an effort to defend his reputation from postwar criticisms.

== Citations ==
Military offices
Preceded by August von Heeringen	Chief of the Admiralty Staff of the Imperial German Navy; 1 Apr 1913 – February 1915	Succeeded by Gustav Bachmann
Preceded by Friedrich von Ingenohl	Commander-in-Chief of High Seas Fleet of the Imperial German Navy; February 1915 – January 1916	Succeeded by Reinhard Scheer
