= Gustav Bachmann =

German admiral in WWI

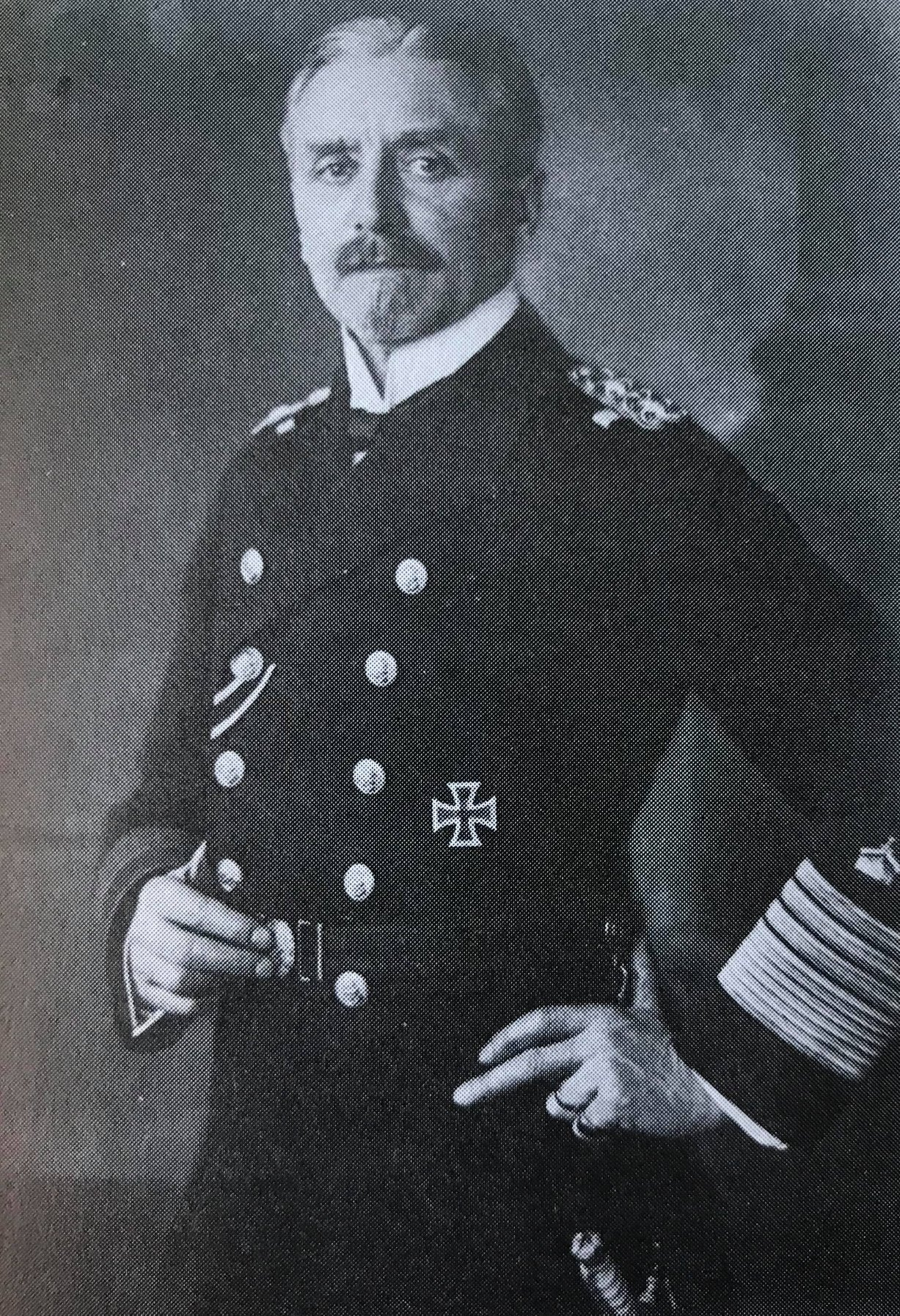
- Born: July 13, 1860; Cammin, Rostock
- Died: August 31, 1943 (aged 83); Kiel
- Spouse: Ella Holzapfel
- Military career
- Allegiance: German Empire
- Branch: Imperial German Navy
- Service years: 1877–1918
- Rank: Admiral
- Commands: SMS Elsaß; Befehlshaber der Aufklärungsschiffe; Chef der Marinestation der Ostsee; Chef des Admiralsstabs der Marine

Gustav Bachmann (July 13, 1860 in Cammin, Rostock – August 31, 1943 in Kiel) was a German naval officer, and an admiral in World War I. He headed the German Imperial Admiralty Staff briefly from February 1915, before being forced out in September 1915 over the failure of the first round of unrestricted submarine warfare.

== Life ==
=== Family ===
Bachmann was the son of the farmer Julius Bachmann (1828—1890) and his wife Anna Bachmann, born Raspe (1830—1914). He married Ella Holzapfel on July 14, 1888. They had two children, a boy and a girl.

=== Military career ===
After his completion of high school in Rostock, Bachmann joined the German Imperial Navy as a cadet on April 21, 1877. He completed basic training and went on the frigate Niobe from April 21, 1877, to September 19, 1877. More training followed on the artillery training ship Renown and the armored frigate König Wilhelm. He attended the German Naval Academy from September 20, 1877, to April 14, 1878. On June 16, 1878, Bachmann was promoted to midshipman.

From June 4 to October 3, 1878, he served on the armored frigate Preussen and from October 4, 1878, to October 6, 1880, he served on the warship Prinz Adalbert. After another visit to the German Naval Academy from October 7, 1880, to October 29, 1881, he was on the artillery training ship Mars and subsequently worked as a company officer until December 21, 1881. On November 16, 1880, he had been promoted to lieutenant. From 1880 to 1884 he was in the II. Sailors Division, II. Shipyard division, and was stationed on the armored frigates Kronprinz, Friedrich Carl, and Preussen.

On May 18, 1884, he became commander of the torpedo boat Sicher. Until the end of September, he worked on further trials of torpedo boats as their commander. From October 4, 1884, to August 9, 1886, Bachmann sailed as deck officer on the cruiser frigate Bismarck. In this period, on January 15, 1885, he promoted to lieutenant. After serving on Bismarck, Bachmann served in the II. Sailors Division and as a watch officer on the cruiser frigate Arcona. From January 1, 1887, until April 1887, he served as adjutant first in Berlin and then worked at the Kaiserliche Werft Wilhelmshaven until October 5, 1890.

After October 1890, Bachmann visited the Naval Academy in Kiel. He was promoted on October 13, 1891, to lieutenant, on May 21, 1898, to lieutenant commander and on January 27, 1903, to commander. He was employed in many different commands and staffs, so from April 1901 to April 1903 he became chief of staff of the East Asia Squadron.

From October 1903 to September 29, 1905, Bachmann worked as an instructor at the Naval Academy and here became a sea captain on April 1, 1904. From September 30, 1903, to September 30, 1907, he was commander of the battleship Elsass and afterwards on the Board of the Central Department of the Navy Office under Admiral Alfred von Tirpitz. He remained in this position until October 31, 1910, and was promoted on January 27, 1909, to rear admiral. He was promoted again to vice admiral on September 5, 1911.

Subsequent to his time in the Reichsmarineamt, Bachmann was commander of the reconnaissance ships and remained so until September 30, 1913. After applying to the Chief of the Naval Station of the Baltic from October 1, 1913, to July 22, 1914, he was provisionally full-time employed as chief of the Naval station from July 23, 1914, to August 2, 1914. He was also governor of the German war port of Kiel.

On February 2, 1915, Bachmann was made Chief of the Naval Staff, where his main task was to run his predecessor Hugo von Pohl's recently approved campaign of unrestricted submarine warfare. On March 22, 1915, he was promoted to Admiral. On September 5, 1915, Bachmann had to vacate the post of Admiralty head. There were disagreements with the political leadership on the issues of submarine warfare. He advocated for no restrictions on the submarine war, even after the sinking of the RMS Lusitania, and bombing of civilian targets. His conflicting views with Kaiser Wilhelm II forced him to resign. He returned to the position of chief of the naval station Baltic and governor of the German naval port of Kiel. From October 28, 1918, to December 13, 1918, he was subordinate to the Secretary of the Admiralty, and then retired.

He lived in Göttingen, later in Kiel, where he died at 83 years old.

=== Awards and decorations ===
- Order of the Red Eagle, First Class with Oak Leaves and Swords
- Order of the Crown 2nd Class with star
- Knight's Cross of the House Order of Hohenzollern
- Iron Cross (1914) 2nd and 1st class
- Service Award Cross
- Military Merit Order of Bavaria, 1st class with swords
- Hanseatic Cross of Hamburg
- Military Merit Cross of Mecklenburg 1st class
- Grand Commander of the Oldenburg House and Merit Order of Peter Frederick Louis
- Friedrich-August-Kreuz 1st class
- Grand Cross of the Albert Order with golden star and swords
- Commander 1st Class of the Saxe-Ernestine House Order
- Honor Cross 3rd Class of Lippe House Order
- Grand Cross of the Friedrich Order with swords

== Bibliography ==
- Hildebrand, Hans; Henriot, Ernest (1988). Deutschlands Admirale : 1849-1945 : die militärischen Werdegänge der See-, Ingenieur-, Sanitäts-, Waffen- und Verwaltungsoffiziere im Admiralsrang (in German). Vol. 1. Osnabrück: Biblio-Verl. pp. 43–44. ISBN 3764814993.

Military offices
Preceded by Hugo von Pohl	Chief of the Admiralty Staff of the Imperial German Navy; 1 February 1915 – 5 September 1915	Succeeded by Henning von Holtzendorff
