= Reinhard Scheer =

German admiral (1863–1928)

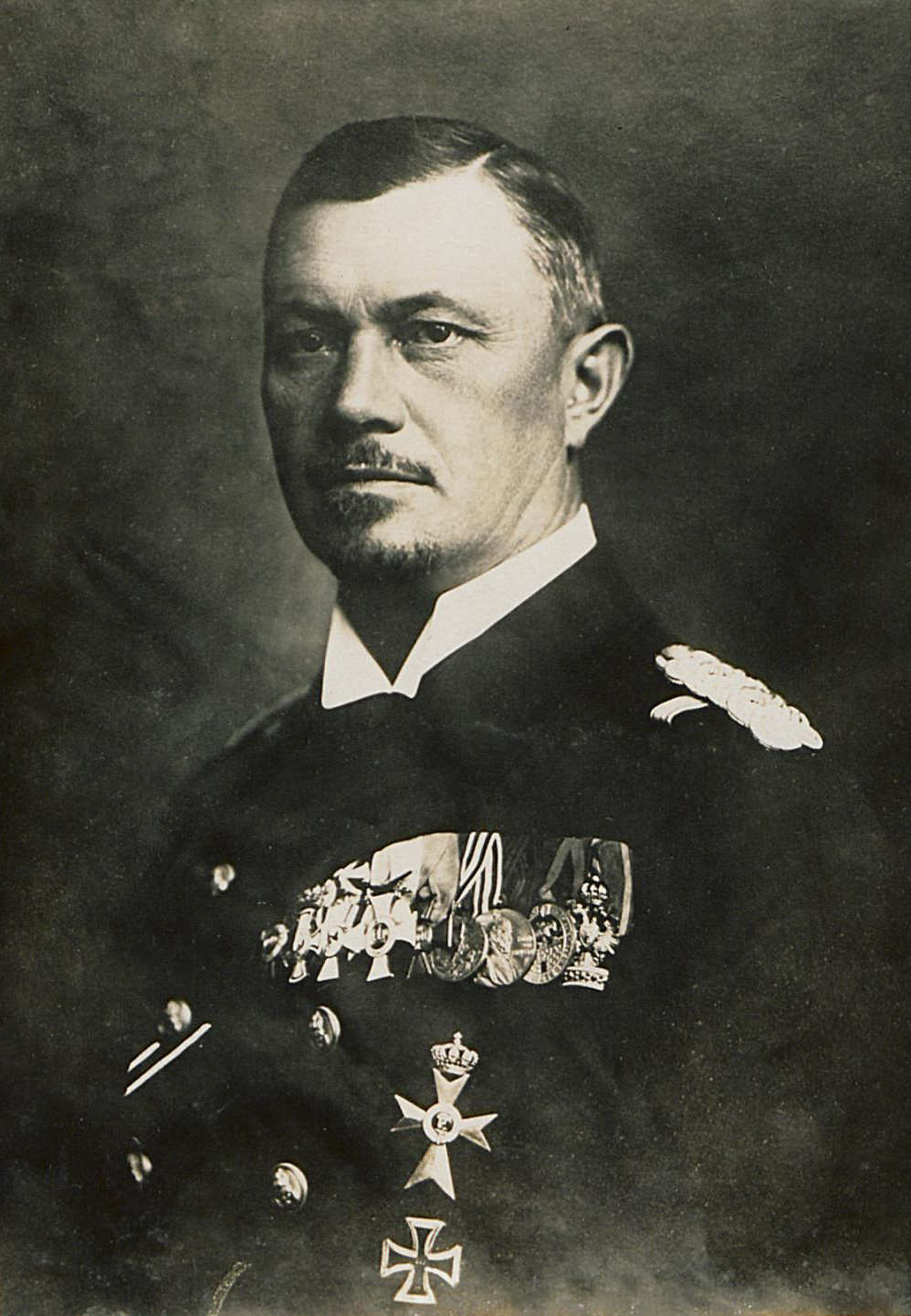
- Reinhard Scheer
- Born: 30 September 1863; Obernkirchen, Electorate of Hesse
- Died: 26 November 1928 (aged 65); Marktredwitz, Weimar Republic
- Military career
- Allegiance: German Empire
- Branch: Imperial German Navy
- Service years: 1879–1918
- Rank: Admiral
- Commands: SMS Gazelle; SMS Elsass; II Battle Squadron; III Battle Squadron; High Seas Fleet; Chief of Naval Staff
- Conflicts: World War I; Lowestoft raid; Battle of Jutland

Carl Friedrich Heinrich Reinhard Scheer (30 September 1863 – 26 November 1928) was an admiral in the Imperial German Navy (Kaiserliche Marine). Scheer joined the navy in 1879 as an officer cadet and progressed through the ranks, commanding cruisers and battleships, as well as senior staff positions on land. At the outbreak of World War I, Scheer was the commander of the II Battle Squadron of the High Seas Fleet. He then took command of the III Battle Squadron, which consisted of the newest and most powerful battleships in the navy. In January 1916, he was promoted to admiral and given control of the High Seas Fleet. Scheer led the German fleet at the Battle of Jutland on 31 May – 1 June 1916, one of the largest naval battles in history.

Following the battle, Scheer joined those calling for unrestricted submarine warfare against the Allies, a move the Kaiser eventually permitted. In August 1918, Scheer was promoted to the chief of Naval Staff; Admiral Franz von Hipper replaced him as commander of the fleet. Together they planned a final battle against the British Grand Fleet, but war-weary sailors mutinied at the news and the operation was abandoned. Scheer retired after the end of the war.

A strict disciplinarian, Scheer was popularly known in the Navy as the "man with the iron mask" due to his severe appearance. In 1919, Scheer wrote his memoirs; a year later they were translated and published in English. He wrote his autobiography in 1925. Scheer died at Marktredwitz. He is buried in the municipal cemetery at Weimar. The admiral was commemorated in the renascent Kriegsmarine by the heavy cruiser Admiral Scheer, built in the 1930s.

== Early career ==
Scheer was born in Obernkirchen, present-day Lower Saxony. He came from a middle-class background, which initially hampered his naval career, as the Kaiserliche Marine was dominated by wealthy families.

Reinhard Scheer entered the navy on 22 April 1879 aged 15 as a cadet. His first sea assignment was aboard the sail-frigate SMS Niobe. His first cruise aboard Niobe lasted from June to September 1879. During the cruise he was trained in navigation and engineering. Following his return to Germany in September, Scheer was assigned to the Naval School in Kiel to continue his officer training. He received only a "satisfactory" rating on his cadet evaluation in 1879, but received the second highest grade in his class for the Sea Cadet's Exam the following year. Following his graduation from the Naval School, Scheer embarked on a six-month-long special training program for gunnery, torpedo warfare, and infantry training. Afterward, he was assigned to the gunnery training ship SMS Renown. Scheer was for a short time assigned to the armored frigate SMS Friedrich Carl. For his last year in cadet training, he was assigned to the frigate SMS Hertha, which conducted a world tour. The ship sailed to Melbourne, Australia, Yokohama, Kobe, and Nagasaki in Japan, and Shanghai, China during the trip.

Following his commission into the German navy, he was transferred to the East Africa Squadron; his first tour with the unit lasted from 1884 to 1886. He was assigned to the crew of the frigate SMS Bismarck. Here he was promoted to Leutnant. He also made important connections in Africa; among those he befriended was Leutnant Henning von Holtzendorff, who would later serve as commander of the High Seas Fleet. During the assignment, in December 1884, Scheer participated in a landing party that suppressed a pro-British indigenous chieftain in Kamerun.

After his return to Germany in 1886, Scheer took part in torpedo training aboard SMS Blücher, from January to May 1888. In May 1888, Scheer returned to the East Africa Squadron as a torpedo officer aboard the corvette SMS Sophie. This tour lasted until early summer 1890, at which point Scheer returned to Germany, where he was made an instructor at the Torpedo Research Command in Kiel. Thus far in his career, Scheer had made a strong reputation for himself as a torpedo specialist. While stationed in Kiel, Scheer met Alfred von Tirpitz, who took note of his expertise. In 1897, following Tirpitz's promotion to State Secretary of the Imperial Navy Office, he transferred Scheer to the Reichsmarineamt (RMA) to work in the Torpedo Section.

After promotion to Korvettenkapitän, Scheer commanded the light cruiser SMS Gazelle. Scheer was promoted to Kapitän zur See in 1905 and took command of the battleship SMS Elsass in 1907, a command he held for two years. A report dated 1 December 1909 recommended Scheer for promotion; he became chief of staff to the commanding officer of the High Seas Fleet, Admiral Holtzendorff, under whom Scheer had served on the cruiser SMS Prinzess Wilhelm. Scheer reached flag rank less than six months after taking his post on Holtzendorff's staff, at the age of 47. He held the chief of staff position until late 1911, when he was transferred back to the RMA under Tirpitz. Here, he held the position of chief of the General Naval Department through 1912. Following this appointment, Scheer returned to a sea command, in the form of squadron commander for the six battleships of the II Battle Squadron of the High Seas Fleet in January 1913.

== World War I ==
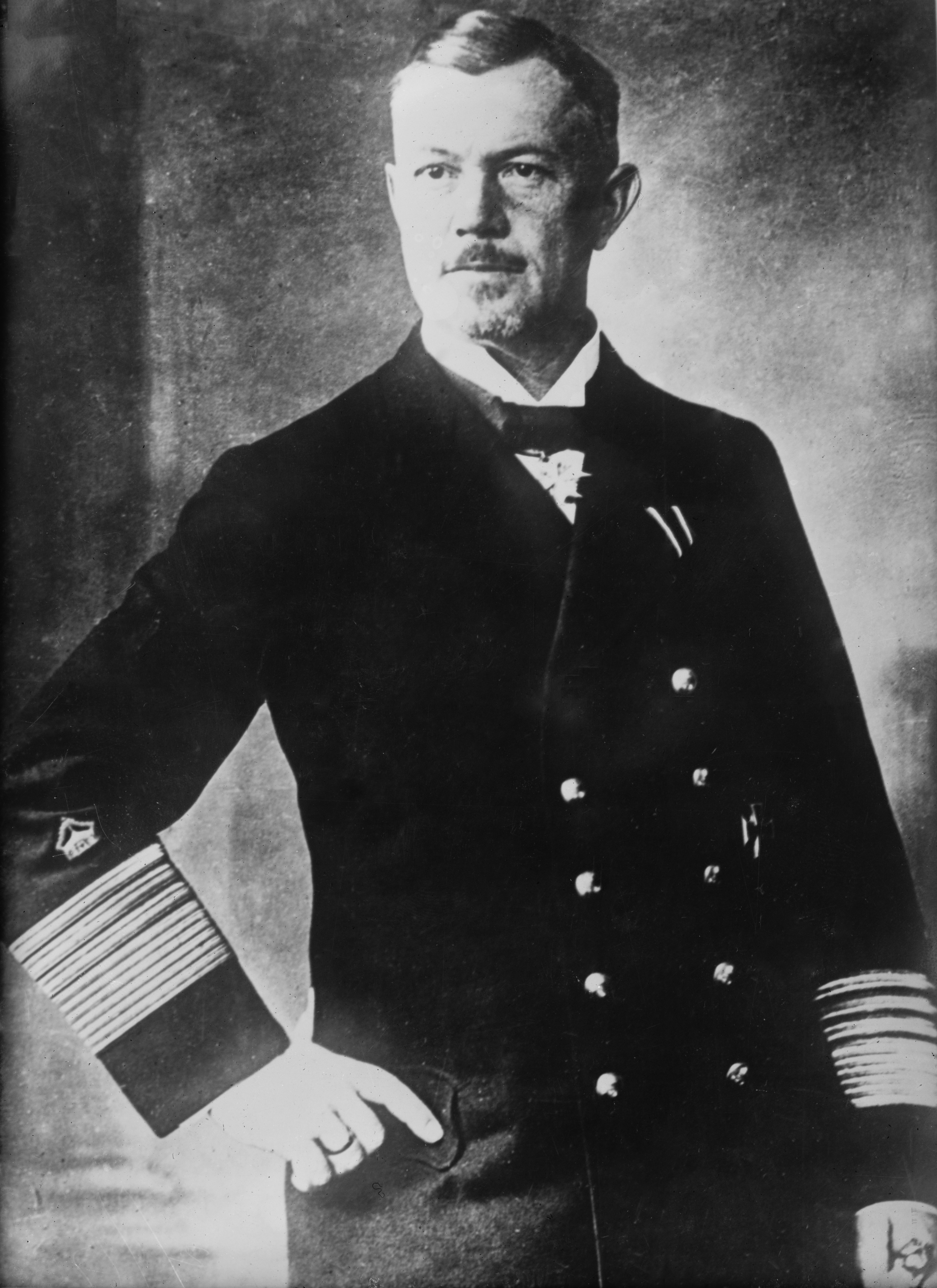
Reinhard Scheer

On 9 December 1913, Scheer was promoted to Vizeadmiral. He remained with the II Battle Squadron until January 1915, by which time World War I had begun. He thereafter took command of the III Battle Squadron, which consisted of the most powerful battleships in the German fleet: the dreadnoughts of the Kaiser and König classes. Scheer advocated raids on the British coast to lure out portions of the numerically superior Royal Navy so they could be overwhelmed by the German fleet. He was highly critical of Admiral Friedrich von Ingenohl, who he felt was overcautious.

Following the bombardment of Scarborough, Hartlepool and Whitby, during which Ingenohl had withdrawn instead of attacking a weaker British squadron, Scheer remarked, "[Ingenohl] had robbed us of the opportunity of meeting certain divisions of the enemy according to the prearranged plan, which was now seen to be correct." Following the loss of SMS Blücher at the Battle of Dogger Bank in January 1915, the Kaiser removed Ingenohl from his post on 2 February. Admiral Hugo von Pohl replaced him as commander of the fleet. Pohl was exceedingly cautious; in the remainder of 1915, he conducted only five ineffective fleet actions, all of which remained within 120 nautical miles of Helgoland.

=== Command of the High Seas fleet ===
Vice Admiral Scheer became commander in chief of the High Seas Fleet on 18 January 1916 when Pohl became too ill to continue in that post. Upon promotion to the position, Scheer wrote Guiding Principles for Sea Warfare in the North Sea, which outlined his strategic plans. His central idea was that the Grand Fleet should be pressured by higher U-boat activity and zeppelin raids as well as increased fleet sorties. The Grand Fleet would be forced to abandon the distant blockade and would have to attack the German fleet; the Kaiser approved the memorandum on 23 February 1916. Now that he had approval from the Kaiser, Scheer could use the fleet more aggressively.

Following the Kaiser's order forbidding unrestricted submarine warfare on 24 April 1916, Scheer ordered all of the U-boats in the Atlantic to return to Germany and abandon commerce raiding. Scheer intended to use the submarines to support the fleet by stationing the U-boats off major British naval bases. The U-boats would intercept British forces leaving the ports when provoked by a bombardment by the I Scouting Group battlecruisers under the command of Vice Admiral Franz von Hipper. Scheer planned the operation for 17 May, but damage to the battlecruiser SMS Seydlitz from the previous month, coupled with condenser trouble on several of the battleships of III Battle Squadron caused the plan to be delayed, ultimately to 31 May.

==== Battle of Jutland ====
Admiral Scheer's fleet, composed of 16 dreadnoughts, six pre-dreadnoughts, six light cruisers, and 31 torpedo boats departed the Jade early on the morning of 31 May. The fleet sailed in concert with Hipper's five battlecruisers and supporting cruisers and torpedo boats. The British navy's Room 40 had intercepted and decrypted German radio traffic containing plans of the operation, and so sortied the Grand Fleet, totaling some 28 dreadnoughts and 9 battlecruisers, the night before in order to cut off and destroy the High Seas Fleet.

At 16:00 UTC, the two battlecruiser forces encountered each other and began a running gun fight south, back towards Scheer's battle fleet. Upon reaching the High Seas Fleet, Vice Admiral David Beatty's battlecruisers turned back to the north to lure the Germans towards the rapidly approaching Grand Fleet, under the command of Admiral John Jellicoe. During the run to the north, Scheer's leading ships engaged the Queen Elizabeth-class battleships of the 5th Battle Squadron. By 18:30, the Grand Fleet had arrived on the scene, and was deployed into a position that would cross Scheer's "T" from the northeast. To extricate his fleet from this precarious position, Scheer ordered a 16-point turn to the south-west. At 18:55, Scheer decided to conduct another 16-point turn to launch an attack on the British fleet; he later explained his reasoning:

It was as yet too early to assume 'night cruising order.' The enemy could have compelled us to fight before dark, he could have prevented our exercising our initiative, and finally he could have cut off our return to the German Bight. There was only one way of avoiding this: to inflict a second blow on the enemy with another advance carried through regardless of cost...It also offered the possibility of a last attempt being made to bring help to the hard-pressed Wiesbaden, or at least of rescuing her ship's company.

This maneuver again put Scheer in a dangerous position; Jellicoe had turned his fleet south and again crossed Scheer's "T." A third 16-point turn followed, which was covered by a charge by Hipper's mauled battlecruisers. Scheer then ordered the fleet to adopt the night cruising formation, which was completed by 23:40. A series of ferocious engagements between Scheer's battleships and Jellicoe's destroyer screen ensued, though the Germans managed to punch their way through the destroyers and make for Horns Reef. The High Seas Fleet reached the Jade between 13:00 and 14:45 on 1 June; Scheer ordered the undamaged battleships of the I Battle Squadron to take up defensive positions in the Jade roadstead while the Kaiser-class battleships were to maintain a state of readiness just outside Wilhelmshaven.

==== Post-Jutland ====
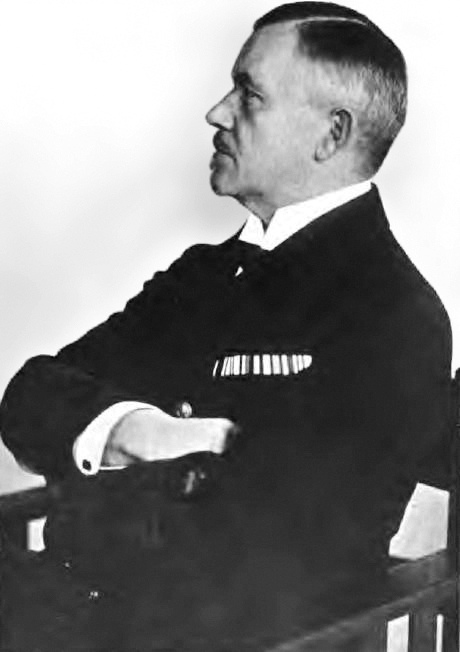
Scheer, from the frontispiece of his memoirs

After the battle was finished, Scheer wrote an assessment of the engagement for the Kaiser; in it, he strongly urged for the resumption of the unrestricted submarine warfare campaign in the Atlantic. He argued that it was the only option to defeat Great Britain. Scheer spent the majority of the remainder of the year debating the issue with the naval command. Ultimately, Scheer and his allies prevailed and the unrestricted submarine campaign was resumed in February 1917. Despite his conviction that only the U-boats could defeat Britain, Scheer continued to utilize the surface fleet. On 18–19 August 1916, the High Seas Fleet again sortied in an attempt to draw out and defeat Admiral Beatty's battlecruiser squadron. The Royal Navy again intercepted German communications and sent the Grand Fleet out. In this case, however, Scheer's reconnaissance worked as intended, and warned him of the Grand Fleet's approach in time to retreat back to Germany. In later 1917, Scheer began to use light elements of the fleet to raid British convoys to Norway in the North Sea. This forced the British to deploy battleships to escort the convoys, which presented Scheer with the opportunity to attempt to isolate and destroy several battleships of the Grand Fleet. On 23 April 1918, Scheer sent the entire High Seas Fleet to intercept one of the convoys. However, Hipper's battlecruisers crossed the convoy's path several times without sighting any ships; it was later discovered that German intelligence had miscalculated the date the convoy would depart Britain. The German fleet turned south and reached their North Sea bases by 19:00.

=== Chief of Naval Staff ===
In June 1918, Scheer was informed that the state of Admiral Holtzendorff's health would not permit him to remain in his post as chief of the naval staff much longer. On 28 July, Scheer was informed that Holtzendorff had submitted his resignation to the Kaiser. Two weeks later, on 11 August 1918, Scheer was promoted to the chief of Naval Staff; his subordinate Franz von Hipper succeeded him in command of the High Seas Fleet. The following day, Scheer met with Field Marshal Paul von Hindenburg and General Erich Ludendorff to discuss the deteriorating war situation. The three agreed that the U-boat campaign would be the sole hope for a German victory, as the German army had been pushed to the defensive. Scheer then called for a crash program to build a vastly increased number of U-boats. He stipulated that, at a minimum, at least 16 additional U-boats be constructed per month in the last quarter of 1918. This was to increase to at least an additional 30 per month by the third quarter of 1919. In total, the plan called for 376 to 450 new U-boats. However, German naval historian Holger Herwig suggested the program was "a massive propaganda effort designed to have an effect at home and abroad."

In October, with the war largely lost, Scheer and Hipper envisioned one last major fleet advance to attack the British Grand Fleet. Scheer intended to inflict as much damage as possible on the British navy, to achieve a better bargaining position for Germany regardless of the cost to the navy. The plan involved two simultaneous attacks by light cruisers and destroyers, one on Flanders and another on shipping in the Thames estuary; the five battlecruisers were to support the Thames attack while the dreadnoughts remained off Flanders. After both strikes, the fleet was to concentrate off the Dutch coast, where it would meet the Grand Fleet in battle. While the fleet was consolidating in Wilhelmshaven, however, war-weary sailors began deserting en masse. As Von der Tann and Derfflinger passed through the locks that separated Wilhelmshaven's inner harbor and roadstead, some 300 men from both ships climbed over the side and disappeared ashore. On 24 October 1918, the order was given to sail from Wilhelmshaven. Starting on the night of 29 October, sailors on several battleships mutinied; three ships from the III Squadron refused to weigh anchors, and acts of sabotage were committed on board the battleships Thüringen and Helgoland. In the face of open rebellion, the order to sail was rescinded and the planned operation was abandoned. In an attempt to suppress the mutiny, the High Seas Fleet squadrons were dispersed.

== Post-war ==
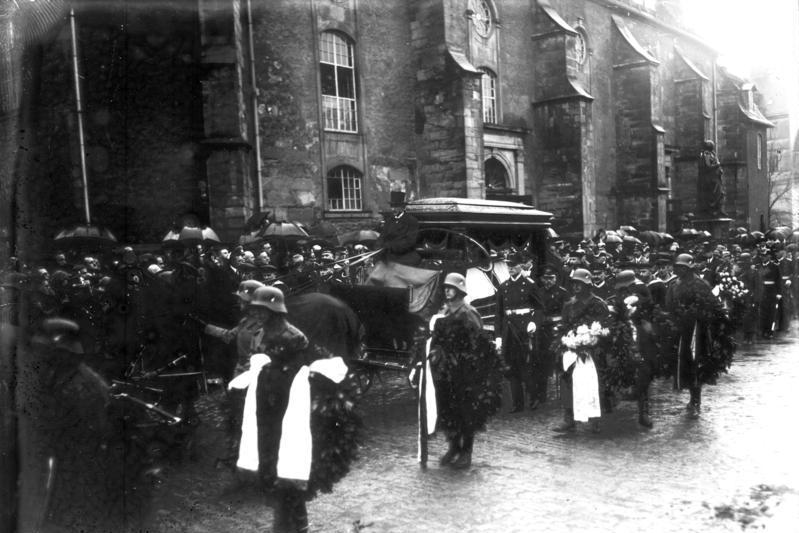
Scheer's funeral at Weimar, November 1928

Scheer wrote his memoirs of the Great War in 1919, which were translated into English the following year. In October 1920, an intruder broke into Scheer's house and murdered his wife, Emillie, his maid, and injured his daughter Else. The man then committed suicide in the cellar. Following the incident, Scheer retreated into solitude. He wrote his autobiography, entitled Vom Segelschiff zum U-Boot (From Sailing Ship to Submarine), which was published on 6 November 1925.

In 1928, Scheer accepted an invitation to meet his adversary from Jutland, Admiral of the Fleet Jellicoe, in England. However, at the age of 65, Scheer died at Marktredwitz before he could make the trip. He was buried in the municipal cemetery at Weimar. His tombstone reads: hier ruht admiral reinhard scheer [Here rests Admiral Reinhard Scheer] — with the dates of his life, his flag in metal applique and the single word skagerrak (the German name for the Battle of Jutland).

The heavy cruiser Admiral Scheer was named after Reinhard Scheer and christened by his daughter Marianne. The ship was ordered and funded by the Reichsmarine of the Weimar Republic and launched in 1933.

== Decorations and awards ==
=== German honours ===
- Grand Cross of the Order of the Red Eagle (Prussia)
- Pour le Mérite (military), 5 June 1916, with Oak Leaves, 1 February 1918 (Prussia)
- Iron Cross (1914), 1st and 2nd class
- Knight's Cross of the Royal House Order of Hohenzollern
- Service Award (Prussia)
- Order of the Crown, 1st class with Swords (Prussia)
- Grand Cross of the Military Order of Max Joseph (Kingdom of Bavaria)
- Grand Cross of the House Order of Albert the Bear (Anhalt)
- Grand Cross of the Military Merit Order (Bavaria)
- Knight's Cross of the Military Order of St. Henry, 23 June 1916 (Saxony)
- Grand Cross of the Albert Order (Saxony)
- Grand Cross of the Order of the Griffon (Mecklenburg)
- Honorary Grand Cross of the House and Merit Order of Peter Frederick Louis (Oldenburg)
- Knight of the Military Merit Order (Württemberg)
- Military Merit Cross, 1st class (Mecklenburg-Schwerin)

=== Foreign honours ===
- Knight Grand Cross of the Imperial Austrian Order of Franz Joseph, 1911 (Austria)
- Knight Grand Cross of the Austrian Imperial Order of Leopold, 1916 (Austria)
- Order of the Rising Sun, 3rd class (Japan)
- Grand Officer of the Order of Saints Maurice and Lazarus (Italy)
- Order of the Iron Crown, 3rd class (Austria)
- Order of Saint Stanislaus, 2nd class

== Footnotes ==
Military offices
Preceded by Hugo von Pohl	Commander-in-Chief of High Seas Fleet; January 23, 1916-August 1918	Succeeded by Franz von Hipper
Preceded by Henning von Holtzendorff	Chief of the Admiralty Staff of the Imperial German Navy; 11 August 1918-14 November 1918	Succeeded by Position dissolved
