= German Imperial Admiralty Staff =

Administrative and nominal operational branch of the Imperial German Navy

Admiralty Staff Admiralstab
- Flag of the Chief of the Admiralty Staff

- The stamp, and official emblem of the Imperial Admiral Staff of the German Empire

Agency overview
- Formed: 14 March 1899
- Preceding agency: Imperial Naval High Command
- Dissolved: 15 September 1919
- Superseding agency: Oberkommando der Marine
- Jurisdiction: German Empire
- Headquarters: Bendlerblock, Berlin
- Agency executive: Chief of the Admiralty Staff

The German Imperial Admiralty Staff (German: Admiralstab) was one of four command agencies for the administration of the Imperial German Navy from 1899 to 1918. While the German Emperor Wilhelm II as commander-in-chief exercised supreme operational command and control of the naval forces, the military staff was split into the Admiralty, the Naval Office, the Naval Cabinet, and the Inspector-General. The command structure had a negative impact on German naval warfare in World War I, as a professional head of the Imperial Navy, similar to the First Sea Lord, was not established until August 1918. After the war and the German Revolution of 1918–19, the Admiralty Staff became subordinate to the Naval Office and was finally disestablished by order of the German President.

The Admiralty Staff had, in principle, overall operational authority over the navy during wartime. In practice this was diluted by the ability of subordinate station commands (such as the High Seas Fleet) to execute control over their own ships, and the ability of the Kaiser to override their directives.

== History ==
After the German unification of 1871, a united Imperial Navy was established as successor of the Prussian Navy and the North German Federal Navy, from 1 January 1872 under the authority of the German Imperial Admiralty (Kaiserliche Admiralität) led by Minister of State Albrecht von Stosch. With the accession of Emperor Wilhelm II in 1888, the naval forces strongly gained in importance. Soon after, the command structure was reorganized with the establishment of the Imperial Naval Cabinet, the German Imperial Naval High Command (Kaiserliches Oberkommando der Marine) and the Naval Office, from 1897 under State Secretary Alfred von Tirpitz.

In the course of the Anglo-German naval arms race, the Reichstag parliament in 1898 passed a new Naval Law, according to which the High Command was, on 14 March 1899, replaced by the Admiralty Staff responsible for planning, officer training, and naval intelligence. In time of war the Admiralty Staff was to assume overall command of the Imperial Navy, although in peacetime it acted only in an advisory capacity. Direct control of the various elements of the fleet was subordinated to officers commanding those elements, accountable to the Kaiser.

This reorganization suited Wilhelm II, who wanted to maintain direct control of his ships. A disadvantage was that it split apart the integrated military command structure, which before had balanced the importance of the navy within overall defense considerations. It also suited Tirpitz, because it removed the influence of the admiralty staff from naval planning, but it left him the possibility, in wartime, to reorganise command around himself. Wilhelm II, however, never agreed to relinquish direct control of his fleet.

During WWI, under the successive control of Admirals Hugo von Pohl, Gustav Bachmann and Henning von Holtzendorff, the Admiralty Staff closely directed German efforts at submarine commerce raiding, pushing strongly and repeatedly for unrestricted submarine warfare. The decisions made by the Admiralty Staff in the conduct of the campaign, which was a major factor leading to the American entry into World War I, has been strongly criticized by postwar German authors. The Admiralty Staff would eventually be reorganized under Reinhard Scheer with the creation of a single supreme naval command in August 1918, shortly before the end of the war.

== Chiefs of the Admiralty Staff ==
(Chefs des Admiralstabs der Kaiserlichen Marine)

No.	Portrait	Chief of the Admiralty Staff	Took office	Left office	Time in office
1	Felix von Bendemann	Admiral; Felix von Bendemann (1848–1915)	14 Mar 1899	31 Dec 1899	292 days
2	Otto von Diederichs	Vice-Admiral; Otto von Diederichs (1843–1918)	1 Jan 1900	19 Aug 1902	2 years, 230 days
3	Wilhelm Büchsel [de]	Vice-Admiral; Wilhelm Büchsel (1848–1920)	20 Aug 1902	28 Jan 1908	5 years, 161 days
3	Friedrich Graf von Baudissin [de]	Admiral; Friedrich Graf von Baudissin (1852–1921)	29 Jan 1908	5 Sep 1909	1 year, 219 days
4	Max von Fischel [de]	Admiral; Max von Fischel (1850–1929)	6 Sep 1909	11 Mar 1911	1 year, 187 days
5	August von Heeringen	Vice-Admiral; August von Heeringen (1855–1927)	12 Mar 1911	31 Mar 1913	2 years, 19 days
6	Hugo von Pohl	Admiral; Hugo von Pohl (1855–1916)	1 Apr 1913	1 Feb 1915	1 year, 306 days
7	Gustav Bachmann	Admiral; Gustav Bachmann (1860–1943)	2 Feb 1915	3 Sep 1915	213 days
7	Henning von Holtzendorff	Grand Admiral; Henning von Holtzendorff (1853–1919)	4 Sep 1915	10 Aug 1918	2 years, 340 days
8	Reinhard Scheer	Admiral; Reinhard Scheer (1863–1928)	11 Aug 1918	14 Nov 1918	95 days
