= German Imperial Naval High Command =

Imperial command staff of the Imperial German Navy (1889-99)

Flag for the Commanding Admiral

The German Imperial Naval High Command (German: Kaiserliches Oberkommando der Marine) was an office of the German Empire which existed from 1 April 1889 until 14 March 1899 to command the German Imperial Navy. A similarly named office existed in the Prussian Navy and the Kriegsmarine of Nazi Germany.

After the dissolution of the German Imperial Admiralty (Kaiserliche Admiralität) on 1 April 1889, the Imperial Naval High Command, the Office of the Inspector-General of the Navy, and the Imperial Naval Office (Reichsmarineamt) were established as successor institutions. The Imperial Naval High Command was headed by a commanding admiral, directly subordinate to the emperor, Wilhelm II of Germany. With the same obligations and rights as a commanding general of the army, this admiral fulfilled the duties of a Chief of the Naval Staff. Under instructions from the emperor, he commanded all naval units at sea and ashore.

When the German Emperor decided to take over the supreme command of the Navy himself on 14 March 1899, the Imperial Naval High Command was disbanded. This happened mainly at the instigation of Admiral Alfred von Tirpitz, to increase the power of his Imperial Naval Office (Reichsmarineamt). Some of the powers of the Imperial Naval High Command were transferred to the previously existing Admiralty Staff.

== Commanding Admirals ==
No.	Portrait	Commanding Admiral	Took office	Left office	Time in office
1	Max von der Goltz	Vice-Admiral; Max von der Goltz (1838–1906)	1 April 1889	8 March 1895	5 years, 341 days
2	Eduard von Knorr	Admiral; Eduard von Knorr (1840–1920)	8 March 1895	14 March 1899	4 years, 6 days

== See also ==
- Oberkommando der Marine

== Sources ==
- Walther Hubatsch: Der Admiralstab und die obersten Marinebehörden in Deutschland 1848-1945. Bernard & Graefe: Frankfurt/Main 1958
- Konrad Ehrensberger: 100 Jahre Organisation der deutschen Marine, Bernard & Graefe: Bonn 1993.
