= Henning von Holtzendorff =

Imperial German Navy official (1853–1919)

- Admiral von Holtzendorff in 1918
- Born: Henning Rudolf Adolf Karl von Holtzendorff; 9 January 1853; Berlin, Prussia
- Died: 7 June 1919 (aged 66); Uckermark district, Weimar Republic
- Military career
- Allegiance: Prussia; North German Confederation; German Empire
- Branch: North German Federal Navy; Imperial German Navy
- Service years: 1869–1913; 1915–1918
- Rank: Großadmiral
- Units: West Africa Squadron; East Asia Squadron; Baltic Sea Naval Station
- Commands: Imperial Shipyard Danzig; I Battle Squadron; High Seas Fleet; Imperial Admiralty Staff
- Conflicts: Franco-Prussian War; Boxer Rebellion; World War I
- Awards: Order of the Black Eagle; Pour le Mérite with oak leaves
- Other work: Member of the House of Lords

Henning Rudolf Adolf Karl von Holtzendorff (9 January 1853 – 7 June 1919) was a German admiral during World War I, who became famous for his December 1916 memo about unrestricted submarine warfare against the United Kingdom. He was a recipient of Order of the Black Eagle and the Pour le Mérite with oak leaves and was one of just six Grand Admirals of the Imperial German Navy.

== Biography ==
Holtzendorff was born into a noble family in Berlin on 9 January 1853. He joined the navy in 1869, served in the Franco-Prussian War and afterwards as a staff officer in the West Africa Squadron. Promoted to captain in 1897; he was present during the Boxer Rebellion as commander of a cruiser in the East Asia Squadron. He served as chief of staff at the Baltic Sea Naval Station and was director of the Imperial Shipyard at Danzig, before becoming a Vice Admiral in 1904. Two years later he was appointed commander of the I Battle Squadron. By 1909 he commanded the High Seas Fleet, becoming a full Admiral in the next year. In 1913 he was forced into retirement due to his opposition to rapid German naval expansion in competition with the British Royal Navy. In the same year he became a member of the Prussian House of Lords.

Vice Admiral von Holtzendorff in 1906

In 1915, after World War I broke out, he was recalled to duty to serve as head of the Imperial Admiralty Staff. During his retirement Holtzendorff converted from a skeptic of unrestricted submarine warfare into one of its strongest proponent. He published a memo in December 1916 that was presented to Kaiser Wilhelm II and approved at the Pless conference in January 1917. The belief that unrestricted submarine warfare would starve Britain and bring about its demise was predicted, with the statement that the United Kingdom will be forced to sue for peace within six months. He also stated that the risk of American intervention could be taken and ignored. This policy succeeded in disturbing both the Royal and the Merchant Navy with Allied shipping losses over 6 million GRT in 1917. German submarines became less successful when convoys were introduced, the US joined the war, and Britain was not compelled to surrender. He did not believe the US would be able to join the war, and thought his submarines would prevent their effective deployment of forces to Europe.

Holtzendorff was promoted to the rank of Großadmiral on 31 July 1918, the sixth and final appointment to that rank in the Imperial Navy. He was retired again after quarrels about war aims with the Oberste Heeresleitung (Supreme Army Command) in August 1918 and replaced by Admiral Reinhard Scheer.

He was the husband of Margarethe Zitelmann and adoptive father to her widowed sister-in-law's two daughters. Admiral Holtzendorff died in the Uckermark district on 7 June 1919.

== Decorations and awards ==
- Order of the Black Eagle with Collar (Prussia, 19 September 1912)
- Grand Cross of the Order of the Red Eagle with oak leaves and swords on rings (Prussia)
- Order of the Crown, 1st class (Prussia)
- Pour le Mérite (22 March 1917) with oak leaves (1 February 1918)
- Commander of the Royal House Order of Hohenzollern with Star and Swords
- Iron Cross, 1st and 2nd class
- Service Award (Prussia)
- Commander Second Class of the Order of the Zähringer Lion (Baden)
- Military Merit Order, 1st class with Swords (Bavaria)
- Hanseatic Crosses of Bremen and Hamburg
- Grand Cross of the Order of the Griffon (Mecklenburg)
- Honorary Grand Cross of the House and Merit Order of Peter Frederick Louis (Oldenburg)
- Friedrich August Cross, 1st class (Oldenburg)
- Grand Cross of the House Order of the White Falcon (Weimar)
- Grand Cross of the Order of the Crown (Württemberg)
- Grand Cross of the Order of Leopold (Austria)

Military offices
Preceded by Prinz Albert Wilhelm Heinrich von Preußen	Commander-in-Chief of the High Seas Fleet; 1909–1913	Succeeded by Friedrich von Ingenohl
Preceded by Gustav Bachmann	Chief of the Admiralty Staff; 1915–1918	Succeeded by Reinhard Scheer
