= German Imperial Naval Office =

Government ministry of the Imperial German Navy

Coordinates: 52.5069°N 13.3614°E

Imperial Naval Office
- Reichsmarineamt

Agency overview
- Formed: April 1, 1889
- Dissolved: July 15, 1919
- Superseding agency: Marineleitung
- Jurisdiction: Reich Chancellery
- Headquarters: Leipziger Platz (until 1914)/ Bendlerblock, Berlin
- Agency executive: Karl Eduard Heusner (1889-1890) Friedrich von Hollmann (1890-1897) Alfred von Tirpitz (1897-1916) Eduard von Capelle (1916–1918) Paul Behncke (1918), Secretaries of State

The Imperial Naval Office (German: Reichsmarineamt—RMA) was a government agency of the German Empire. It was established in April 1889, when the German Imperial Admiralty was abolished and its duties divided among three new entities: the Imperial Naval High Command (Kaiserliches Oberkommando der Marine), the Imperial Naval Cabinet (Kaiserliches Marinekabinett) and the Imperial Naval Office performing the functions of a ministry for the Imperial German Navy.

Managed by a state secretary, the RMA oversaw administrative aspects of the navy, including construction of new ships and maintenance of existing vessels. In 1897, Admiral Alfred von Tirpitz became the state secretary of the RMA, and he used the position to push through major construction programs through the German Naval Laws. While he succeeded in creating a large battle fleet, the High Seas Fleet, this set Germany on a path toward confrontation with Britain, then the world's preeminent naval power. This eventually resulted in conflict during World War I in 1914.

== Creation ==
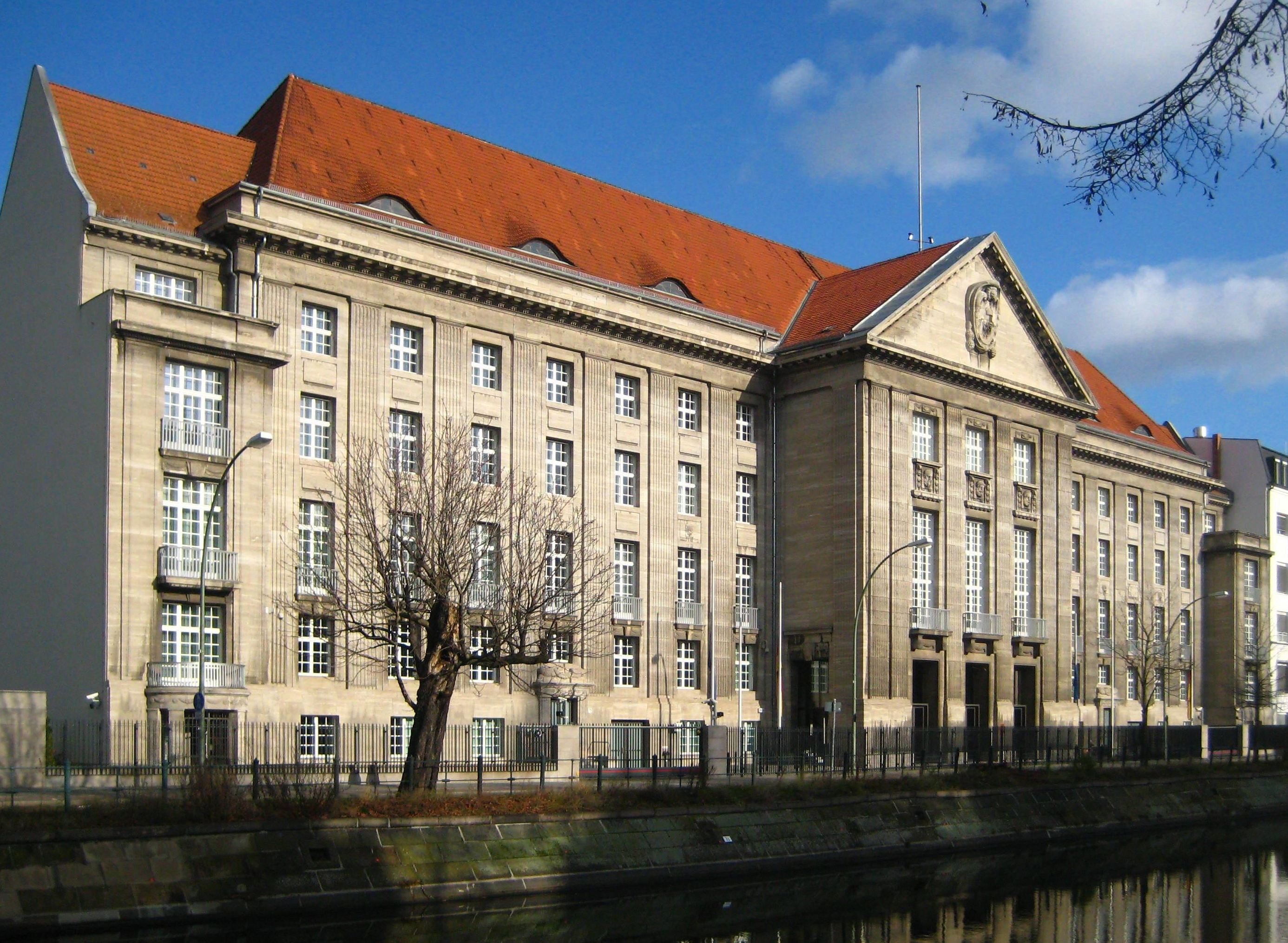
Bendlerblock office building

From the founding of the German Empire in 1871, the command structure of the German Kaiserliche Marine (Imperial Navy) resided in the Kaiserliche Admiralität (Imperial Admiralty). In stages in late March 1889, the new German emperor, Kaiser Wilhelm II, abolished the admiralty, creating three bodies: the Oberkommando der Marine (OKM—Naval High Command), the Marinekabinett (Naval Cabinet), and the Reichsmarineamt (RMA—Imperial Naval Office). The OKM was created on 20 March; the Marinekabinett followed on the 28th, and the RMA followed on 30 March. These departments reported directly to Wilhelm, who retained power as the commander in chief. Vizeadmiral Max von der Goltz was appointed as the first chief of the high command; Gustav von Senden-Bibran became the head of the cabinet, and Konteradmiral Karl Eduard Heusner served as the first secretary of the RMA.

=== Role ===
The naval command exercised operational control of the fleet, developed strategy and tactical doctrines, and organized annual training exercises. The RMA handled administrative issues, including construction and maintenance of the fleet, while the Marinekabinett served to advise Wilhelm, and to plan officer appointments to the various posts in the navy. Control of the RMA was placed in a State Secretary, which was subordinated to the chancellor, though he had a direct audience with the kaiser. As originally envisioned, the RMA had no input on strategy or deployment of the fleet's ships. One of his chief responsibilities was to secure the passage of annual naval appropriations bills in the Reichstag (Imperial Diet), which required him to present the planned expenses for debate.

Following his appointment to the post of state secretary of the RMA in 1897, Konteradmiral Alfred von Tirpitz embarked on a campaign to reduce the power of the high command to strengthen his position in the naval command structure. After trying and failing to abolish it altogether, he succeeded in convincing Wilhelm to reorganize the department in accordance with his ideas two years later. The OKM was abolished on 14 March 1899, and most of its command responsibilities passed to the newly created Admiralstab (Admiralty Staff), though tactical control was left to the fleet commander. This fragmented command of the fleet created room for Tirpitz to exert greater influence over operational matters.

=== Organization ===
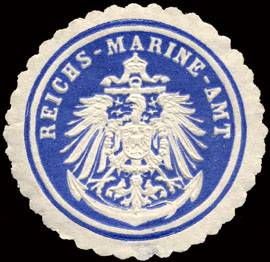
Seal of the Imperial Naval Office

The Reichsmarinamt comprised several departments that oversaw all of the tasks under its direction, and these grew in number and size over the course of the RMA's existence. These included (with code letters in parentheses):

- Central Department (M)
- Shipyards Department (B)
- Administrative Department (C)
- Weapons Department (W)
- Medical Department (G)
- News Bureau (N)
- General Navy Department (A)
- Construction Department (K)
- Nautical Department (H)
- Legal Department (J)

The Administrative Department coordinated the building of warships between the various involved parties, such as technical experts, naval officers, and both public and private shipyards. Periodic meetings were organized to monitor progress on construction programs, budgetary issues, and research efforts; these were attended by representatives from all of the other RMA departments. The Construction Department, referred to as "K" directly oversaw the design and construction of new vessels. It was, itself, divided into four branches: "KI", which covered general construction processes; "KII", which coordinated with shipyards and other machinery contractors; "KIII", which organized initial testing and sea trials of newly built ships; and "KIV", which monitored the building of ships to ensure that proper protocols were followed. The Construction Department maintained an inspectorate for such supervision, and it worked in tandem with the Technical Department in that regard.

Other departments included the Nachrichtenbüro (News Bureau), which was used to disseminate pro-naval-expansion propaganda in support of larger construction programs of the Tirpitz era. The Budget Department evaluated the feasibility of construction programs relative to approved budgets, and also interacted with the Reichstag to secure the needed funding. The Purchasing Office controlled the issuance of contracts to the various shipyards and component manufacturers, and it coordinated with the Construction Inspectorate to ensure that materials provided by these firms met requirements.

From 1914 to 1919, the RMA was headquartered at the Bendlerblock building complex in the Leipziger Platz in Berlin, along with the Admiralstab and the Marinekabinett. The RMA was located in the main building, while the other two departments were located in the right wing of the complex.

== History ==
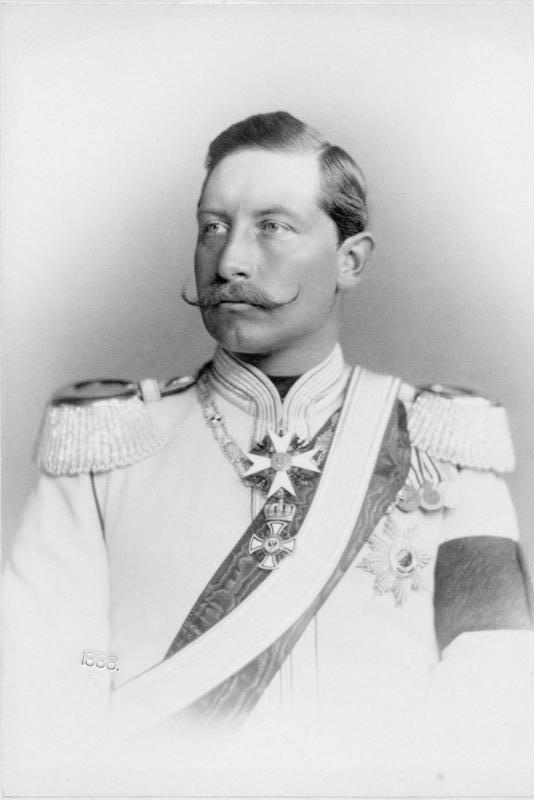
Kaiser Wilhelm II, who established the Imperial Naval Office in 1889

=== Early years ===
Heusner, the first state secretary of the RMA, secured passage of a significantly expanded naval budget for the 1890–1891 fiscal year, but then resigned in April 1890, owing to complications from an infection he had contracted while in African waters in 1887. The ships for which he had won funding comprised a variety of different types, including the first of four Brandenburg-class battleships, several coastal defense ships of the Siegfried class, and both large and small cruisers. They represented the strategic confusion that marked the late 1880s and 1890s, which had been brought about by the rise of the Jeune École (Young School) in France. The French doctrine emphasized cruisers for commerce raiding and torpedo boats for coastal defense against an enemy equipped with expensive battleships.

Konteradmiral Friedrich von Hollmann replaced Heusner, though he lacked administrative skills or a clear vision of the direction the navy should take. He was chronically unsuccessful in his attempts to acquire money for additional battleships from the Reichstag during his seven-year tenure, in large part due to his inability to articulate a clear plan to the parliament's deputies. He nevertheless secured funds to build several more cruisers and coastal defense ships. Funds were finally made available for a new battleship, the first of the Kaiser Friedrich III class, in 1895. Four large cruisers were also added; by this time, opposition to Hollmann's continued tenure had grown considerably, but the ordering of these vessels, which the kaiser favored, prevented his dismissal for a time.

By the mid-1890s, Alfred von Tirpitz had begun his campaign to focus development of the German fleet into a force centered on a large number of battleships, in opposition to the Jeune École. This was in keeping with the ideas of the American naval officer Alfred Thayer Mahan and his seminal work The Influence of Sea Power upon History. At that time, Tirpitz served as the chief of staff to the OKM chief, first Goltz and then Eduard von Knorr; there, he had influence on operational use of the fleet, but no input on warship construction projects, despite his prolific writings on the subject. His views nevertheless reached Wilhelm II by 1895, who received them favorably. In early 1896, Wilhelm demanded a large fleet proposal from Hollmann along Tirpitz's lines, while the latter was sent to command the East Asia Division to burnish his credentials for his eventual promotion to replace Hollmann.

For the 1896–1897 fiscal year, Hollmann succeeded in convincing the Reichstag to authorize a second Kaiser Friedrich III-class battleship and several smaller vessels, but by the end of the year, he had become convinced that the larger plan that Wilhelm demanded had no hopes of passing. His proposed budget for 1897–1898, which included a third new battleship, encountered heavy resistance, though the parliament eventually agreed to fund the battleship, albeit with cuts to other building projects. His failure to convince the Reichstag to fund the expected program led to Hollmann's resignation on 30 March 1897; Tirpitz, who was still in Asia, was appointed to replace him the following day.

=== Tirpitz era ===
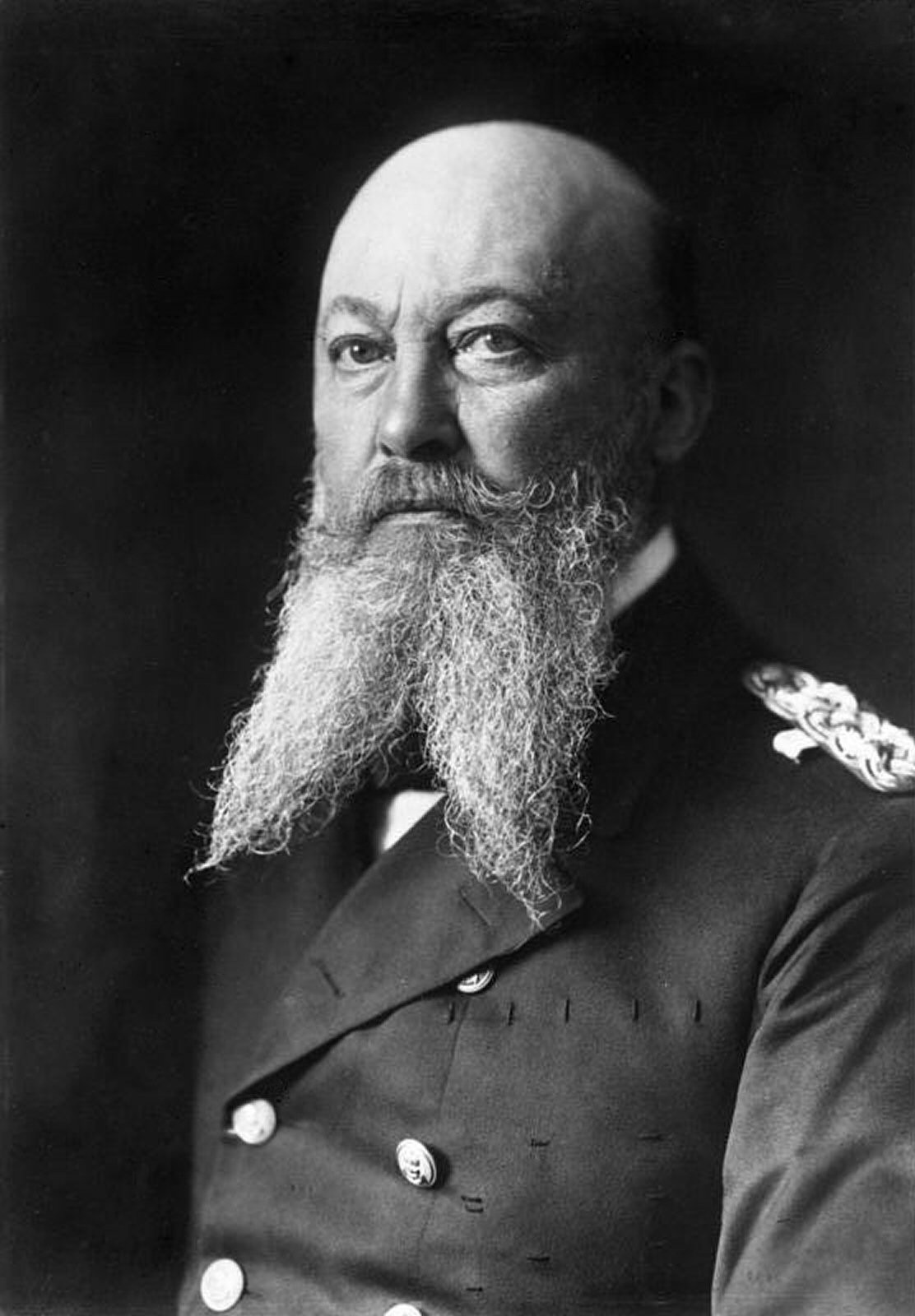
Alfred von Tirpitz

In April 1897, Knorr drafted a preliminary version of what would become the first Naval Law, which called for a fleet of 25 battleships, 8 armored cruisers, 46 smaller cruisers, and over a hundred torpedo boats, among other craft, to be completed by 1910. More importantly, it included a provision that battleships would be automatically replaced every 25 years, removing the requirement to seek parliamentary approval for each replacement ship. After arriving in Berlin in June, Tirpitz presented his own draft, which increased the number of battleships by two and made other changes to the prescribed force structure, including accelerating the pace of construction, forecasting a completion date of 1905. Tirpitz then embarked on a public relations campaign to increase support for his plans, particularly among the elites of the northern Hanseatic cities of Hamburg, Bremen, and Lübeck, which had historically opposed naval expansion. He also met with powerful representatives in the Reichstag, including Ernst Lieber, the leader of the Centre Party. When the vote came on 10 April 1898, the bill passed narrowly, but Tirpitz had secured a major victory. Two more Kaiser Friedrich III-class battleships were ordered immediately, followed soon thereafter by the five-strong Wittelsbach class.

Already by 1900, Tirpitz seized the opportunity that arose during the Second Boer War in South Africa and the Boxer Uprising in China to pass the Second Naval Law. The new act significantly expanded the fleet to 38 battleships, and armored cruisers, among other ships. These laws were enshrined in the empire's constitution, which made it impossible for future parliaments to rescind the authorized ships or associated funding, short of passing another amendment. It also counted ships on a one-for-one basis, meaning that by 1906, the navy was planning to replace the 7,600-metric-ton (7,500-long-ton; 8,400-short-ton) Sachsen-class ironclads with dreadnought battleships that more than doubled their size, the 18,900 t (18,600 long tons; 20,800 short tons) Nassau class. Future replacements became even more ludicrous: the 3,500 t (3,400 long tons; 3,900 short tons) Siegfried-class coastal defense ships, which were counted as battleships in the Naval Laws, were superseded by 24,700 t (24,300 long tons; 27,200 short tons) Kaiser-class battleships. By 1907, enough battleships had been completed to create two full squadrons of modern battleships, and the fleet became reorganized as the High Seas Fleet.

To reward him for passing the first Naval Law, Wilhelm ennobled Tirpitz. Following the abolition of the OKM in 1899, Tirpitz's control over the navy continued to grow, particularly as officers within his clique were promoted to flag rank and were placed in the various fleet and station commands. Tirpitz's successes came with a cost, however. While the British Royal Navy initially disregarded the German construction program, the British public quickly seized on the apparent threat to the country's position as the preeminent naval power. Admiral Jackie Fisher soon embarked on a series of reforms that allowed the Royal Navy to concentrate its fleet in home waters, and the Anglo-German naval arms race began. Diplomatically, Britain secured alliances or agreements with Japan and France, the latter Britain's traditional naval rival, which further strengthened its position relative to Germany. Ultimately, the significant expansion of the German battle fleet led to Britain joining the Triple Entente with France and Russia, which would become Germany's opponents during World War I, a conflict that ended in the collapse of the German Empire.

=== Final years ===
After the war, the Imperial Naval Office was disestablished on 15 July 1919, when by decree of Reich President Friedrich Ebert its responsibilities were assigned to the Admiralty Staff, which was transformed into the Marineleitung agency of the German Reichswehr Ministry in 1920.

== State Secretaries ==
Flag for the Staatssekretär Reichsmarineamt

- Karl Eduard Heusner 1889 – April 1890
- Friedrich von Hollmann April 1890 – 30 March 1897
- Wilhelm Büchsel (interim)
- Alfred von Tirpitz 18 June 1897 – 15 March 1916
- Eduard von Capelle 15 March 1916 – September 1918
- Paul Behncke September 1918 – 5 October 1918
- Ernst Ritter von Mann Edler von Tiechler 5 October 1918 – 13 February 1919
- Maximilian Rogge, acting head official since December 1918, 13 February 1919 – 15 July 1919
