= List of German Jews =

The first Jewish population in the region to be later known as Germany came with the Romans to the city now known as Cologne. A "Golden Age" in the first millennium saw the emergence of the Ashkenazi Jews, while the persecution and expulsion that followed the Crusades led to the creation of Yiddish and an overall shift eastwards. A change of status in the late Renaissance Era, combined with the Jewish Enlightenment, the Haskalah, meant that by the 1920s Germany had one of the most integrated Jewish populations in Europe, contributing prominently to German culture and society. During The Holocaust many Jews fled Germany to other countries for refuge, and the majority of the remaining population were killed.

The following is a list of some famous Jews (by religion or descent) from Germany proper.

== Historical figures ==
=== Politicians ===
- Ludwig Bamberger, politician
- Daniel Cohn-Bendit, member of European Parliament, student leader in 1968
- Kurt Eisner, Bavarian prime minister
- Fritz Elsas, Mayor of Berlin from 1931 to 1933, (converted to Christianity)
- Heinrich von Friedberg, jurist, statesman (converted to Christianity)
- Karl Rudolf Friedenthal, Prussian politician (converted to Christianity)
- Clement Freud, German-born British MP
- Rudolf Hilferding, Finance Minister in 1923 and from 1928 to 1929
- Alex Himelfarb, ambassador
- Helmut Schmidt, Chancellor of West Germany (1974–1982)
- Henry Kissinger, U.S. Secretary of State, Nobel Prize (1973)
- Ludwig Landmann, mayor of Frankfurt/Main
- Eduard Lasker, co-founder of the National Liberal Party
- Eugen Leviné, Bavarian prime minister
- Jutta Oesterle-Schwerin, Member of parliament, Green party, Feminist party
- Eduard von Simson, President of the Reichstag, President of the Reichsgericht
- Walther Rathenau, Foreign Minister of the Weimar Republic
- Herbert Weichmann, Mayor of Hamburg 1965–1971, president of the German Bundesrat (Federal upper house)
- Marina Weisband, Ukrainian-born former Pirate Party Germany politician
- Walter Wolfgang, German-born politician

=== Activists ===
- Hedwig Dohm-Schleh, feminist, author
- Nahum Goldmann, president of World Jewish Congress
- Charlotte Knobloch (born 1932), community leader.
- Amalie Nacken (1855–1940), Munich-based philanthropist
- Josel of Rosheim, court Jew and Jewish advocate
- Paul Spiegel, leader of the Central Council of Jews in Germany
- Sidonie Werner (1860–1932), women's rights activist

== Religious figures ==
=== Rabbis ===
- Aaron ben Benjamin Wolf, Chief Rabbi of Berlin (1709)
- Isaac Bernays, Chief Rabbi of Hamburg (1830s), teacher of S. R. Hirsch
- Aaron Moses ben Mordecai of East Prussia
- Abraham Auerbach (mid 1700s – 3 November 1846), Alsatian-born rabbi and liturgical poet. Fled France for Germany after imprisonment during the Reign of Terror.
- Ahron Daum, Chief Rabbi of Frankfurt am Main
- Jacob Ettlinger, Major Torah scholar, author of Aruch LaNer
- Abraham Geiger, founding father of Reform Judaism
- Samson Raphael Hirsch, intellectual founder of the Torah im Derech Eretz school of contemporary Orthodox Judaism
- Immanuel Jakobovits, Chief Rabbi of Great Britain
- Elijah Loans, rabbi of Fulda, Hanau, Friedberg, and Worms
- Seligmann Meyer, rabbi of Regensburg
- Leopold Zunz (10 August 1794 – 17 March 1886), founder of academic Jewish studies

=== Reform ===
- Levi Herzfeld, 19th-century proponent of moderate reform

=== Other ===
- Ridley Haim Herschell, missionary
- Joseph Wolff, missionary

== Scientific figures ==
=== Natural scientists ===
- Adolf von Baeyer, industrial chemist, Nobel Prize (1905) (Jewish mother)
- Norbert Berkowitz, physicist
- Hans Bethe, nuclear physics, Nobel Prize (1967) (Jewish mother)
- Sir Walter Bodmer, medical researcher
- Max Born, quantum mechanics, Nobel Prize (1954) (converted to Christianity)
- Heinrich Caro, industrial chemist
- Nikodem Caro, industrial chemist
- Albert Einstein, theoretical physics, Nobel Prize (1921)
- Erwin Finlay-Freundlich, astronomer
- James Franck, quantum physics, Nobel Prize (1925)
- Adolph Frank, industrial chemist
- Herbert Fröhlich, physicist
- Eugen Glueckauf, chemist, expert on atomic energy
- Hans Goldschmidt, industrial chemist
- Fritz Haber, developed the Haber process, Nobel Prize (1918)
- Walter Heitler, chemist
- Arthur Korn, physicist
- Ernst Ising, statistical mechanics
- Albert Ladenburg, chemist
- Fritz London, quantum mechanics
- Leonard Mandel, quantum optics
- Kurt Mendelssohn, German-born British medical physicist
- Viktor Meyer, organic chemist (converted to Christianity)
- Leonor Michaelis, biochemist
- Albert A. Michelson, measured speed of light, Nobel Prize (1907) (Jewish father)
- Ludwig Mond, chemist and industrialist
- Sir Rudolf Peierls, solid state theory
- Arno Penzias, co-discoverer of CMB, Nobel Prize (1978)
- Alfred Philippson, geologist
- John Charles Polanyi, chemist, Nobel Prize (born Berlin)
- Ernst Pringsheim, spectrometry, black-body radiation
- Michael Rossmann, physicist and microbiologist (Jewish mother)
- Rudolf Schoenheimer, biochemist
- Arthur Schuster, spectroscopist
- Karl Schwarzschild, physicist and astronomer (converted to Christianity)
- Franz Simon, physicist, separation of Uranium 235
- Jack Steinberger, particle physics, Nobel Prize (1988)
- Otto Stern, experimental physicist, Nobel Prize (1943)
- Moritz Traube, biochemist
- Wilhelm Traube, chemist, caffeine/purine synthesis
- Otto Wallach, chemist, Nobel Prize (1910) (converted to Christianity)
- Richard Willstätter, chemist, Nobel Prize (1915)

=== Physicians and medical researchers ===
- Alfred Bielschowsky, ophthalmologist
- Max Bielschowsky, neuropathologist
- Konrad Bloch, biochemist, Nobel Prize (1964)
- Marcus Elieser Bloch, physician
- Gustav Born, professor of pharmacology
- Edith Bulbring, professor of pharmacy (Jewish mother)
- Sir Ernst Chain, developed penicillin, Nobel Prize (1945)
- Ferdinand Cohn, pioneer in microbiology
- Julius Friedrich Cohnheim, pathologist
- Paul Ehrlich, developed magic bullet concept, Nobel Prize (1908)
- Arthur Eichengrün, possible inventor of aspirin
- Wilhelm Feldberg, biologist
- Heinz Fraenkel-Conrat, biochemist
- Hermann Friedberg, physician
- Salome Gluecksohn-Waelsch, geneticist
- Ernst Gräfenberg, obstetrician, the intrauterine device, the G-spot
- Martin Gumpert, physician, writer
- Friedrich Gustav Jakob Henle, physician (converted to Christianity)
- Sir Bernard Katz, biophysicist, Nobel Prize (1970)
- Hans Kornberg, biochemist researcher
- Hans Kosterlitz, discovered endorphins
- Sir Hans Adolf Krebs, biochemist, Nobel Prize (1953)
- Rudolph Lennhoff, developed the open air cure for tuberculosis
- Fritz Lipmann, biochemist, Nobel Prize (1953)
- Jacques Loeb, physiologist
- Otto Loewi, pharmacologist, Nobel Prize (1936)
- Elisabeth Mann, biologist (Jewish mother)
- Otto Meyerhof, biochemist, Nobel Prize (1922) (Jewish father)
- Oskar Minkowski, physiologist
- Albert Neisser, physician, discovered the cause of gonorrhea (Jewish father)
- Emin Pasha, physician, naturalist, explorer
- Ludwig Pick, pathologist. Pioneering research on pheochromocytoma.
- Nathanael Pringsheim, botanist
- Ottomar Rosenbach, physician
- Moritz Heinrich Romberg, physician, innovative author in neuroscience
- Karl Stern, Canadian neurologist, psychiatrist, author
- Rahel Straus (1880–1963), medical doctor and feminist
- Ludwig Traube (1818–1876), medical doctor, introduced regular tracking of vital signs (respiration, temperature, pulse)
- Moshe Wallach, founder and director, Shaare Zedek Hospital, Jerusalem
- Carl Warburg, doctor of medicine and clinical pharmacologist.
- Otto Heinrich Warburg, physiologist, Nobel Prize (1931) (Jewish father)
- Karl Weigert, pathologist

=== Mathematicians ===
- Felix Bernstein, set theory (converted to Christianity)
- Maurice Block, statistician
- Richard Brauer, modular representation theory
- Paul Cohn, algebraist
- Richard Courant, mathematical analysis and applied mathematics
- Max Dehn, topology
- Paul Epstein, number theory
- Adolf Fraenkel, set theory
- Hans Freudenthal, algebraic topology
- Friedrich Hartogs, mathematician
- Felix Hausdorff, topology
- Heinz Hopf, topology (Jewish father)
- Adolf Hurwitz, mathematician
- Carl Gustav Jakob Jacobi, analysis
- Leopold Kronecker, number theory
- Edmund Landau, number theory
- Rudolf Lipschitz, mathematician
- Kurt Mahler, mathematician
- Hermann Minkowski, geometrical theory of numbers
- Claus Moser, statistician
- Leonard Nelson, mathematician, philosopher (converted to Christianity)
- Bernhard Neumann, mathematician
- Emmy Noether, algebra and theoretical physics
- Alfred Pringsheim, analysis, theory of functions
- Richard Rado, combinatorics
- Robert Remak, group theory
- Abraham Robinson, nonstandard analysis
- Arthur Moritz Schönflies, mathematician
- Issai Schur, mathematician
- Reinhold Strassmann, mathematician
- Otto Toeplitz, linear algebra and functional analysis

=== Technical scientists ===
- Ralph Baer, inventor of the games console
- Emile Berliner, inventor of the gramophone
- Emanuel Goldberg (1881–1970, from Russia, but published in German), pioneered Microdots and microfilm retrieval technology
- Julius Edgar Lilienfeld, electrical engineer
- Siegfried Marcus, automobile pioneer
- Michael O. Rabin, computer algorithms, Turing Award (1976)
- Reinhold Rudenberg, electrical engineer and inventor,
- Adolf Schallamach, pioneered understanding of friction and wear phenomena in rubber
- Joseph Weizenbaum, AI critic, ELIZA

=== Psychologists ===
- Karl Abraham, psychoanalyst
- Rudolf Arnheim, perception theorist
- Erik Erikson, developmental psychologist (Jewish mother)
- Erich Fromm, psychologist and humanistic philosopher
- Erika Fromm, psychologist and co-founder of hypnoanalysis.
- Benedict Friedlaender, sexologist
- Frieda Fromm-Reichmann, psychoanalyst
- Kurt Goldstein, Gestalt-influenced neurologist
- Max Hamilton, psychiatrist
- Magnus Hirschfeld, sexologist
- Kurt Koffka, Gestalt psychologist
- Kurt Lewin, social psychologist
- Hugo Münsterberg, industrial psychologist
- Ulric Neisser, cognitive psychologist (Jewish father)
- Erich Neumann, analytical psychologist
- Fritz Perls, psychotherapist
- Otto Selz, cognitive psychologist
- William Stern, the Intelligence Quotient
- Max Wertheimer, Gestalt psychologist

== Academic figures ==
=== Philosophers ===
- Theodor Adorno (1903–1969), philosopher (Jewish father)
- Hannah Arendt, political philosopher
- Leo Strauss, political philosopher
- Ernst Bloch, philosopher
- Constantin Brunner, philosopher
- Ernst Cassirer, philosopher
- Hermann Cohen, philosopher
- Friedrich Dessauer, philosopher
- Max Dessoir, philosopher
- Julius Frauenstädt, philosopher
- Kurt Grelling, philosopher
- Hermann Heller, philosopher
- Richard Hönigswald (Jewish father)
- Max Horkheimer (1895–1973), philosopher and sociologist
- Edmund Husserl, philosopher (converted to Christianity)
- Hans Jonas, philosopher
- Horace Kallen, philosopher
- Adolf Lasson, philosopher
- Theodor Lessing, philosopher, writer
- Karl Löwith, philosopher
- Salomon Maimon, philosopher
- Fritz Mauthner, author and philosopher
- Moses Mendelssohn, philosopher, scholar
- Helmuth Plessner, philosopher (Jewish father)
- Hans Reichenbach, philosopher (Jewish father)
- Eugen Rosenstock-Huessy, philosopher (Jewish father)
- Max Scheler, philosopher (Jewish mother)
- Edith Stein, philosopher, martyr and saint of the Catholic Church
- Kurt Sternberg, philosopher
- Richard Rudolf Walzer, philosopher (Jewish Year Book 1975 p. 214)

=== Economists ===
- Robert Aumann, Nobel Prize for Economics
- Richard Ehrenberg, economist (converted to Christianity)
- Ludwig Lachmann, economist
- Emil Lederer, economist
- Robert Liefmann, economist
- Adolph Lowe, economist
- Rosa Luxemburg, economist, co-founder of the KPD
- Peretz Naftali, economist, editor, later Israeli finance minister
- Sigbert Prais, economist (JYB 2005 p. 215)
- Reinhard Selten, Nobel prize (1994)
- Hans Singer, economist

=== Social Scientists ===
- Reinhard Bendix, sociologist
- Eduard Bernstein, founder of evolutionary socialism
- Franz Boas, cultural anthropologist
- Lewis A. Coser, sociologist
- Norbert Elias, sociologist
- Amitai Etzioni, sociologist
- Shelomo Dov Goitein, Arabist
- Moses Hess, socialist
- Eugene Kamenka, sociologist
- Siegfried Kracauer, sociologist and film critic
- Ferdinand Lassalle, founder of first German worker's party
- Karl Mannheim, sociologist
- Herbert Marcuse, sociologist, New Left figurehead
- Karl Marx, founder of Marxism (parents converted to Protestantism)
- Franz Oppenheimer, sociologist and economist
- Leo Loewenthal, sociologist
- Georg Simmel, sociologist
- Georg Steindorff, Egyptologist (Jewish father)
- Jacob Taubes, theologist
- Louis Wirth, sociologist

=== Historians ===
- Ernst Bernheim, historian
- Walter Cahn, art historian
- Colin Eisler, art historian
- Geoffrey Rudolph Elton (son of Victor Ehrenberg)
- Richard Ettinghausen, art historian
- Henry Friedlander, historian
- Peter Gay, historian
- Heinrich Graetz, historian
- George W. F. Hallgarten, historian
- Eric Hobsbawm, historian
- Isaak Markus Jost, historian
- Ernst Kantorowicz, historian of medieval political and intellectual history
- Richard Krautheimer, historian
- Arno Lustiger, historian
- Golo Mann, historian (Jewish mother)
- George Mosse, historian
- Erwin Panofsky, art historian
- Otto Rahn, historian of legends about the holy grail
- Hans Rothfels, historian
- Fritz Stern, historian
- Aby Warburg, art historian
- Rudolf Wittkower, architectural and art historian
- Michael Wolffsohn, historian

=== Jurists ===
- Jacob Friedrich Behrend, jurist
- David Daube, Professor of Law
- Heinrich Dernburg, jurist (converted to Christianity)
- Victor Ehrenberg, jurist (converted to Christianity)
- Eugen Ehrlich (converted to Christianity)
- Eduard Gans (converted to Christianity)
- Hugo Haase, jurist
- Sir Otto Kahn-Freund, Professor of Law
- Julius Anton Glaser (converted to Christianity)
- Georg Jellinek (converted to Christianity)
- Hermann Kantorowicz, jurist
- Walter Kaskel, jurist
- Robert Kempner, jurist
- Paul Laband, jurist, b. Breslau (converted to Christianity)
- Otto Lenel, jurist
- Ernst Levy, jurist
- Franz Neumann, legal theorist
- Arthur Nussbaum, jurist
- Joseph Süss Oppenheimer, financial planner and court Jew
- Gabriel Riesser, deputy speaker of Frankfurt Assembly in 1848, first Jewish judge in Hamburg
- Rudolf Schlesinger, jurist
- Eduard von Simson, President of the Reichstag, President of the Reichsgericht
- Hugo Sinzheimer, legal scholar
- Joseph Unger (converted to Christianity)
- Wilhelm Eduard Wilda (converted to Christianity)
- Sigmund Zeisler, jurist

=== Linguists and philologists ===
- Paulus Aemilius, professor of Hebrew
- Theodor Benfey, linguist (converted to Christianity)
- Eduard Fraenkel, philologist
- Wilhelm Freund, philologist
- Ludwig Friedländer, philologist
- Julius Fürst, orientalist
- Theodor Goldstücker, linguist
- Moshe Goshen-Gottstein, linguist
- Victor Klemperer, linguist and diarist
- Siegbert Salomon Prawer, Professor of German
- Chaim Menachem Rabin, linguist
- Edward Sapir, anthropologist-linguist
- Ernest Simon, professor of Chinese
- Heymann Steinthal, linguist

=== Educationalists ===
- Lewis Elton, educationalist
- Kurt Hahn, educationalist
- Henriette May (1862–1928), German Jewish educator and women's activist

== Entertainment ==
=== Showbusiness ===
- Hugo Egon Balder, comedian, producer (Jewish mother)
- Ludwig Berger, director
- Lotte Berk, dancer and health guru
- Christian Berkel, actor
- Kurt Bernhardt, director
- Ludwig Blattner: film producer and studio owner, developer of the first magnetic tape recorder.
- Artur Brauner, film producer
- Michael Degen, actor
- Ernst Dohm, actor, editor
- Hedwig Dohm-Pringsheim, actress
- E.A. Dupont, director
- Michel Friedman, TV personality
- Kurt Gerron, stage actor and film director
- Dora Gerson, actress, cabaret singer
- Therese Giehse, actress Pepermill
- Lou Jacobs, clown
- Ludwig Karl Koch, broadcaster and sound recordist
- Werner Klemperer, Movie, TV Hogan's Heroes and Broadway actor, violinist
- Carl Laemmle, film producer
- Robert Lembke, journalist and well-known TV show host (Jewish father)
- Ernst Lubitsch, director
- Jeanine Meerapfel, film director and screenwriter
- Max Ophüls, film director
- Richard Oswald, director
- Lilli Palmer, actress
- Luise Rainer, actress
- Hans Rosenthal, one of Germany's most popular TV personalities in history
- Susan Sideropoulos, actress
- Robert Siodmak, director
- Ruth Westheimer (born 1928), German-American sex therapist, talk show host, author, Doctor of Education, Holocaust survivor, and former Haganah sniper.
- Konrad Wolf, film director
- Peter Zadek, theatre director

=== Musicians ===
- Samuel Adler, composer
- Haim Alexander, composer
- Tzvi Avni, composer
- Paul Ben-Haim, composer
- Julius Benedict, composer
- Herman Berlinski, American composer, organist, pianist, musicologist and choir conductor
- Wolf Biermann, singer/songwriter (Jewish father)
- Yehezkel Braun, Israeli composer
- Manfred Bukofzer, musicologist
- Paul Dessau, composer
- Abel Ehrlich, Israeli composer
- Alfred Einstein, musicologist
- Hanns Eisler, German-born composer (Jewish father)
- Lukas Foss, composer and conductor
- Alexander Goehr, composer
- Walter Goehr, conductor
- Berthold Goldschmidt, composer
- Bernard Greenhouse, cellist
- Nina Hagen, German-Jewish origin from her father's side, Punk Rock Singer, she was considered an opera prodigy by the time she was nine. Her paternal grandfather died in the Sachsenhausen concentration camp.
- George Henschel, singer and conductor
- Fanny Hensel, composer
- Alfred Hertz, conductor
- André Herzberg, musician (Pankow)
- Ferdinand Hiller, composer, conductor and pianist
- Gerard Hoffnung, musicologist
- Friedrich Holländer, composer
- Salomon Jadassohn, composer
- Leon Jessel, composer
- Robert Kahn, composer
- Otto Klemperer, conductor
- Robert Lachmann, musicologist
- Ludwig Lenel, organist and composer
- Hermann Levi, conductor
- Alfred Lion and Frank Wulff, founders of Blue Note Records
- Edward Lowinsky, musicologist
- Gustav Mahler, composer
- Michael Mann, musician (Jewish mother)
- Arnold Mendelssohn, organist
- Felix Mendelssohn, composer and conductor (Jewish ancestry but raised Lutheran)
- Giacomo Meyerbeer, composer
- Ben-Zion Orgad, Israeli composer
- Menahem Pressler, pianist
- André Previn, conductor
- Franz Reizenstein, pianist, composer
- Curt Sachs, musicologist, co-founder of modern organology
- Kurt Sanderling, conductor
- Adolf Martin Schlesinger, music publisher
- Arnold Schoenberg, composer
- Heinrich Sontheim, tenor
- William Steinberg, conductor
- Erich Walter Sternberg, composer
- Josef Tal, composer
- Ilia Trilling, synagogue composer
- Ignatz Waghalter, composer and conductor
- Bruno Walter, conductor (Jewish father)
- Franz Waxman, film composer
- Kurt Weill, composer
- Hans Winterberg, composer
- Stefan Wolpe, composer
- Alec Empire, member of Atari Teenage Riot
- Hilde Zadek, soprano
- Hans Zimmer, film score composer and record producer

=== Artists ===
- Anni Albers, textile designer
- Frank Auerbach, painter
- Eduard Bendemann, painter
- Erwin Blumenfeld, photographer
- Alfred Eisenstaedt, photographer
- Benno Elkan, sculptor
- James Ingo Freed, architect
- Gisèle Freund, photographer
- Eva Hesse, materials artist
- Erich Kahn, painter, expressionist
- Eugen Kaufmann, architect
- Hugo Lederer (1871–1940) sculptor
- Ludwig Levy, architect
- Max Liebermann, painter
- Peter Max, pop artist
- Ludwig Meidner, painter
- Erich Mendelsohn, architect
- Alice Michaelis, painter
- Helmut Newton, photographer (Jewish father)
- Felix Nussbaum, painter
- Meret Oppenheim, surrealist
- Else Oppler-Legband, architect, interior designer, fashion designer, and stylist
- Erwin Panofsky, art historian
- Martin Erich Philipp, artist
- Hans Schleger, designer
- Charlotte Salomon, artist
- Erich Salomon, news photographer
- Erna Weill, sculptor
- Victor Weisz, Vicky, cartoonist

=== Other ===
- Josef Ganz, car designer
- Siegfried Marcus, car designer
- Edmund Rumpler, Austro-German car designer
- Jacqueline Van Maarsen, author and best friend of diarist Anne Frank
- Hanneli Goslar, friend of diarist Anne Frank and holocaust survivor
- Sanne Ledermann, friend of diarist Anne frank and holocaust victim

== Writers ==
- Erich Auerbach, literature critic
- Berthold Auerbach, author and poet
- Julius Bab, dramatist and theater critic
- Jurek Becker, writer
- Maxim Biller, writer
- Ludwig Börne, satirist
- Otto Brahm, literary critic
- Henryk Broder, journalist
- Walter Benjamin (1892–1940), literary critic and philosopher
- Emil Carlebach, writer, dissident
- Joseph Derenbourg, orientalist, father of Hartwig Derenbourg
- Hilde Domin, poet
- Lion Feuchtwanger, novelist
- Hubert Fichte, author (Jewish father)
- Anne Frank, diarist
- Karen Gershon (1923–1993), poet
- Friedrich Gundolf, literary man
- Glückel of Hameln, 18th-century female Yiddish diarist
- Maximilian Harden, journalist
- Heinrich Heine, poet (converted to Protestantism for job prospects)
- Stefan Heym, novelist, politician
- Wolfgang Hildesheimer
- Edgar Hilsenrath, novelist
- Barbara Honigmann, writer
- Heinrich Eduard Jacob, writer and journalist
- Siegfried Jacobsohn, journalist and theater critic
- Ruth Prawer Jhabvala, novelist and screenwriter
- Wladimir Kaminer, short story writer
- Judith Kerr, children's writer
- Victor Klemperer, writer
- Else Lasker-Schüler, writer, poet and artist (converted to Protestantism for job prospects)
- Robert Liebmann, screenwriter.
- Claire Loewenfeld, writer and herbalist
- Hugo Lubliner, dramatist.
- Emil Ludwig, writer
- Erika Mann, writer, actress (Jewish mother)
- Klaus Mann, writer (Jewish mother)
- Monika Mann, writer (Jewish mother)
- Liselotte Marshall, novelist
- Julius Mosen, born Moses
- Erich Mühsam, anarchist poet
- Solomon Perel, author
- Marcel Reich-Ranicki, literary critic
- H. A. Rey and Margret Rey, creators of Curious George
- Renate Rubinstein (Jewish father)
- Nelly Sachs, poet, Nobel Prize (1966)
- Anna Seghers, novelist
- Oskar Seidlin, writer
- Süßkind von Trimberg, medieval writer, minnesinger
- Kurt Tucholsky, writer (converted to Protestantism)
- Samuel Ullman, poet
- Rahel Varnhagen, writer and saloniste (converted to Christianity)
- Moritz Callmann Wahl
- Jakob Wassermann, novelist
- Trude Weiss-Rosmarin
- Jeanette Wohl
- Victoria Wolff (1903–1992), German born American writer and screenwriter
- Friedrich Wolf, writer, physician
- Carl Zuckmayer, playwright (Jewish mother)
- Arnold Zweig, writer
- Stefan Zweig, novelist, playwright and journalist, best known for his autobiographies
- Hedwig Lachmann, author, translator and poet

== Entrepreneurs ==
See also Court Jews

- Alfred Beit, financier
- Sir Ernest Cassel, banker
- Maurice de Hirsch, banker
- Sir Robert Mayer, German-born businessman and philanthropist
- Israel Jacob (1729–1803)
- Marcus Goldman (1821–1904), German-born banker, co-founder of Goldman Sachs
- Abraham Kuhn and Solomon Loeb, founders of Kuhn, Loeb & Co.
- Henry Lehman (1822–1855), Emanuel Lehman (1827–1907) and Mayer Lehman (1830–1897), German-born bankers, co-founders of former bank Lehman Brothers
- Joseph Mendelssohn (1770–1848), founder of former bank Mendelssohn & Co.
- Salomon Oppenheim (1772–1828), founder of bank Sal. Oppenheim
- Ernest Oppenheimer (1880–1957), diamond and gold mining entrepreneur and financier who controlled De Beers and founded the Anglo American Corporation of South Africa
- Emil Rathenau (1838–1915), founder of AEG
- Adolf Rosenberger, co-founder of Porsche
- Mayer Amschel Rothschild (1744–1812), "founding father of international finance"
- Nathan Mayer Rothschild (1777–1836), founder of British company N M Rothschild & Sons
- Victor Henry Rothschild (1835–1911), German-born merchant and manufacturer in the United States, founder of V. Henry Rothschild & Company
- Hermann Tietz (1837–1907), founder of Hertie, a department store
- Leopold Ullstein (1826–1899), founder of publishing company Ullstein Verlag
- Moses Marcus Warburg and Gerson Warburg, co-founder of M. M. Warburg & Co., German bank
- Georg Wertheim (1857–1939), founder of former Wertheim, a department store
- Stef Wertheimer (1926–2025), German-born industrialist
- Gustav Wilhelm Wolff, founder of Harland and Wolff

== Sports ==
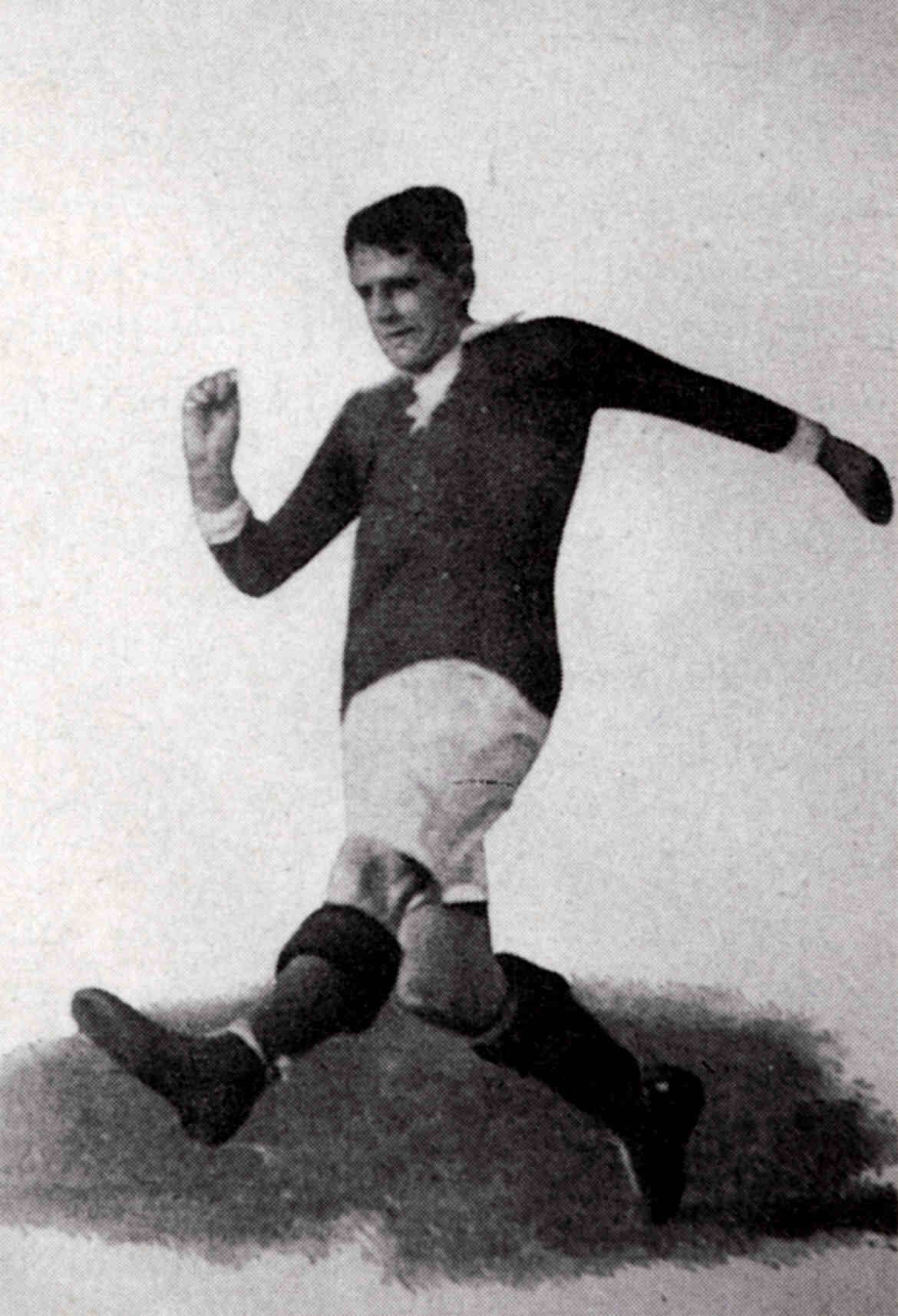
Gottfried Fuchs

- Alon Abelski, football player
- Rudi Ball, ice hockey player, right wing, Olympic bronze, world runner-up, bronze
- Gretel Bergmann, high jumper
- Hans Berliner, world postal chess champion
- Barney Dreyfuss, co-founder of the World Series
- Alfred Flatow, 3 time Olympic gymnastics champion (parallel bars, team parallel bars, team horizontal bar), silver (horizontal bar)
- Gustav Felix Flatow, 2 time Olympic gymnastics champion (team parallel bars, team horizontal bar)
- Gottfried Fuchs, soccer player, (German national team)
- Ludwig Guttmann, founder of the Paralympics
- Lilli Henoch, world records (discus, shot put, and 4x100-m relay); shot by the Nazis in Latvia
- Fredy Hirsch, sport teacher
- Julius Hirsch, footballer, German champion, killed during the Holocaust
- Bernhard Horwitz, chess player
- Herbert Klein, swimmer, Olympic bronze (200-m breaststroke); 3 world records
- Emanuel Lasker, world chess champion
- Henry Laskau, racewalker, won 42 national titles; Pan American champion; 4x Maccabiah champion
- Helene Mayer, foil fencer (Jewish father), Olympic champion
- Sarah Poewe, swimmer (Jewish mother), Olympic bronze (4x100 medley relay)
- Ellen Preis (Ellen Müller-Preis) (1912–2007), German-born Austrian Olympic champion foil fencer
- Daniel Prenn, tennis player, highest world ranking # 6
- Eugen Sandow, bodybuilding pioneer
- Anton Shynder, football player
- Siegbert Tarrasch, chess player

== See also ==
- History of the Jews in Germany
- List of Austrians
- List of Austrian Jews
- List of Czech, Bohemian, Moravian and Slovak Jews
- List of Germans
- List of Galician Jews
- List of West European Jews
- Lists of Jews
