= Capture of the North Frisian Islands =

Campaign in the 2nd Schleswig War 1864

Capture of the North Frisian Islands and Rømø
- Part of Second Schleswig War
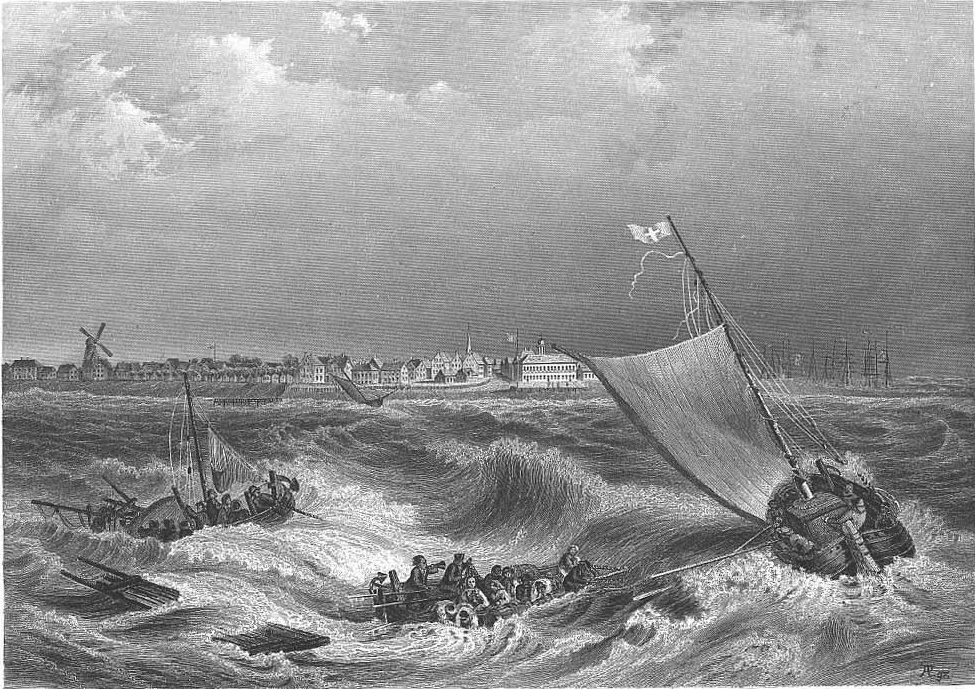
- Battle for Wyk
Date	12 July – 20 July 1864
Location	North Frisian Islands and Rømø
Result	Austro-Prussian victory

Belligerents
Austria; Prussia	Denmark

Commanders and leaders
Bernhard von Wüllerstorf-Urbair; Ernst von Prittwitz und Gaffron	Otto Christian Hammer

Strength
One ironclad One ship of the line One steamer Four gunboats	250 men One paddle steamer One screw steamer 8 gun dinghies each with 17 men and one cannon 12 inch cutters 10 other coasters

Casualties and losses
(indirect) two hunters due to a stabbing	Nine officers and 185 sailors taken prisoner

The capture of the North Frisian Islands and Rømø in July 1864 was the last military operation of the Second Schleswig War between Denmark and Prussia and the Austrian Empire around the duchies of Schleswig and Holstein, which belonged to Denmark. It ended with the occupation of the North Frisian Islands and Rømø by Austrian troops.

== Background ==
After Prussia and Austria had already largely brought the duchies of Schleswig and Holstein under their control as a result of the Prussian Battle of Dybbøl, an armistice came into force on 12 May 1864. After the failure of peace negotiations at the London Conference of 1864, Prussia and Austria agreed in their June 1864 Carlsbad Agreement to resume the war. With the end of the truce, the conquest of the remaining parts of the duchies began, including the Wadden Sea Islands on the west coast of Schleswig. However, Amrum, southern Rømø, northern Sylt and western Föhr did not belong to the Duchy of Schleswig, but were part of Denmark. Rømø was overwhelmingly Danish while Sylt, Föhr and Amrum were overwhelmingly home to North Frisians, the latter islands having both pro-German and pro-Danish settlements.

On the Danish side, Lieutenant Captain Otto Christian Hammer, having rejoined the Danish Navy after serving as customs, lighthouse and sea mark inspector (Danish: told-, fyr- og vagerinspektør) on the river Eider, was commissioned with defending the North Frisian Islands. He had previously held the same civilian position on Föhr which became his base of operations. In order to suppress a pro-German uprising, Hammer resorted to draconian measures. He also took action against unrest on Sylt. To finance his operations, he had all customs, tax and post offices confiscated. On 3 March he arrested four suspected pro-German collaborators, including Andreas Andersen, in Keitum on Sylt. On 13 June he surrounded Keitum and arrested eight rebels. Among them was the local poet Christian Peter Hansen, who described Hammer's behavior as a "tyrannical regiment" and described him as a "Viking tyrannizing over land and people" and who disseminated his personal views in his later writings. In contrast, the pro-Danish community on the islands presented Hammer with a sword of honour after the war.

The west coast of Schleswig-Holstein fell into Austria's area of operations and Rear Admiral Bernhard von Wüllerstorf-Urbair decided to conquer the islands. He was supported by Prussian units. Due to bad weather, the Austro-Prussian flotilla left Cuxhaven for the theater of operations two days later than planned, on 11 July.

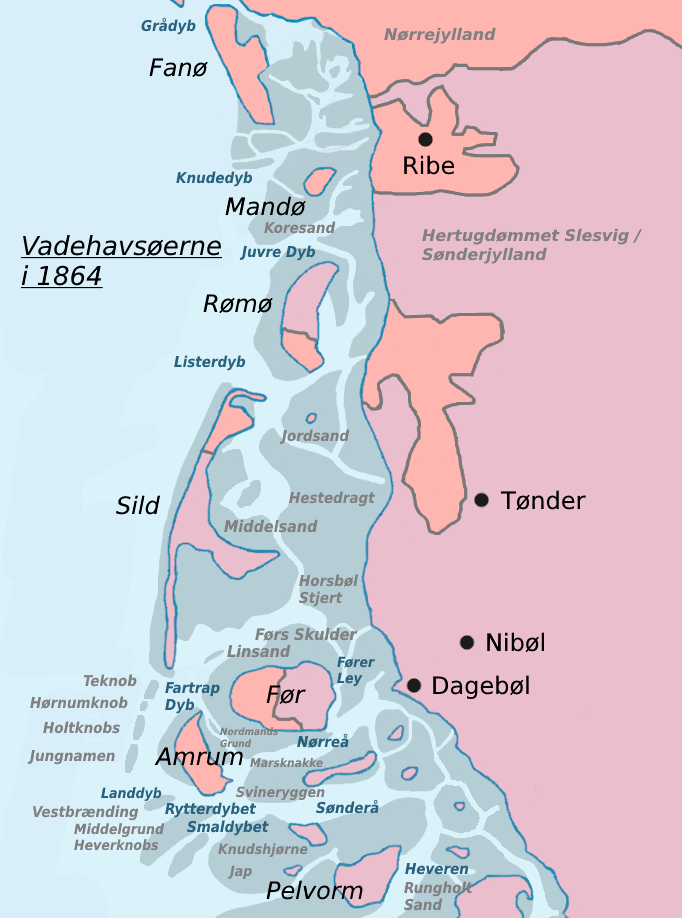
Map of the Danish Wadden Sea islands 1864.

== Occupation of the islands ==
=== The forces of both sides ===
The Danish fleet consisted of:

- The paddle steamer Lymfjord
- The screw steamer Augusta
- 8 gun dinghies each with 17 men and one cannon
- 12 revenue cutters
- 10 other coasters

The Austro-Prussian fleet consisted of:

- The ironclad SMS Juan d'Austria (Austria)
- The Ship of the Line Kaiser (Austria)
- The steamer SMS Kaiserin Elizabeth (1854)|Elisabeth (Austria)
- The gunboat SMS Basilisk (Prussia)
- The gunboat SMS Blitz (Prussia)
- The gunboat SMS Seehund|Seal (Austria)
- The gunboat SMS Wall|Wall (Austria)

Because in parts of the North Friesian and Danish Wadden Sea only ships with a shallow draft could be deployed, the Dickschiffe were mostly only indirectly involved in the operation. The four gunboats were under the command of the Austrian Fregattenkapitäns Karl Kronowetter. Added to this were the 5th and. 6th Company of the K.u.k. Field Police Battalion No. 9 from Styria under the command of Lieutenant Colonel Franz von Schidlach.

=== Oland and Sylt ===
On 6 July Oland was taken by General Staff Captain Wiesner with nine fighters. The small force had waded across from the mainland. Since the island had no military value, they withdrew after two hours. The attempted landing on Sylt on 12 July by Feldjäger with Ruderkanonenjollen was thwarted by the shelling of the Danish and perhaps also the Austrian gunboats. Because the Austrian navy had not been informed that the Austrian army should intervene. Andreas Andersen then offered three Austrian army officers to take them from Højer Sogn to the Austrian fleet command off List. The men walked from Jerpstedt through the dried-up mud flats and were within a third of a mile of the shipping fleet when the tide came in. In mortal danger, she took the gunboat "Seal" on board at the last minute. There the men transmitted an order from the ministry in Vienna that the Austrian land army should help with the liberation of Sylt and Föhr. So the military police tried their luck again on 13 July. When they came under fire again, they simply pulled the small rowboats onto a sandbank and waited for the tide to go out, which forced the gunboats to retreat. In the end, 200 Austrian military police managed to get to the island. The 5th company crossed from Højer to Keitum and the 6th company from Klanxbüll to Morsum; they were welcomed as liberators by the pro-German population. In front of Keitum they had erected a gate of honor with the inscription: "German brothers, you are welcome!". In Morsum, the soldiers were entertained and the four commanders were made honorary citizens.

=== Rømø, Föhr and Amrum and blockade of the Wadden Sea Islands ===
On 14 July the island of Rømø was occupied by Captain Wendt from Ballum. On 16 July they occupied List and crossed over to Föhr and Amrum with two gunboats.

On 17 July, the Allies blocked the access routes from the North Frisian Wadden Sea to the North Sea by two Austrian units under Rear Admiral Bernhard von Wüllerstorf-Urbair and Vice Admiral Wilhelm von Tegetthoff.

=== Foehr, Langeneß and Gröde ===
At 6 a.m. on 18 July, the Danish flotilla began being shelled in the port of Wyk auf Föhr and the occupation of Langeness and Gröde.

Three hours earlier, however, the Prussian Lieutenant Colonel Gustav von Stiehle and the Danish Colonel Heinrich von Kauffmann (Chief of the General Staff) in Christiansfeld had signed the armistice between Prussia, Austria and Denmark signed.

=== Surrender of the Danish defenders ===
When the Allies learned that the armistice would not come into force until 20 July, hostilities resumed on 19 July. As a result, on 19 July, seven officers, two civil servants and 185 men from the Danish flotilla surrendered to the Allied forces in view of the hopeless situation. Hammer had used the night to set off in the Wadden Sea with his gunboat Liimfoerd. He was only caught in the evening by the Prussian gunboat Blitz, then lowered the flag and handed over his sword with his first officer at 7:30 p.m., a few hours before the armistice came into force. This was forwarded to Prince Adalbert by the commander of the Blitz, lieutenant Archibald MacLean.

== Consequences ==
The captured Danish ships were first brought to Cuxhaven and remained in Prussian possession. From 20 to 22 July, Hammer was initially released to his family in Wyk. When he went out in the village, he was protected by Austrian hunters from attacks by the population. Then he was transported via Husum, Rendsburg to Altona to be imprisoned.

Due to the outcome of the war and the resulting Peace of Vienna, the islands initially became part of the Austrian-Prussian Condominium in Schleswig-Holstein. The Austrian troops stayed on the islands for another three months. Therefore, on 18 August 1864, the 34th birthday of Emperor Franz Josef as co-regent was celebrated on Föhr. The Wyker Fleckenkollegium sent him a telegram of congratulations on this occasion.
