= Caroline Hammer =

Danish photographer (1832–1915)

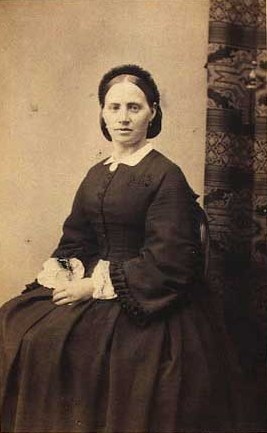
- Born: 28 October 1832; Hulerød near Hornbæk
- Died: 12 January 1915 (aged 82); Fredensborg
- Occupation: Photographer
- Relatives: Otto Christian Hammer (brother); Sigurd Hammer (nephew)

Caroline Hammer (1832–1915) was one of the earliest professional women photographers in Denmark. She established a business as a portrait photographer on the Frisian island of Föhr where she had her own studio. Hammer was the first woman to become a member of the Dansk Fotografisk Forening in 1881.

== Biography ==
Born on 28 October 1832 in Hulerød near Hornbæk in northern Zealand, Caroline Hammer was the daughter of the district commissioner and naval hero Frederik Abel Hammer (1791–1877) and Elisabeth Kirstine Lemvigh (1794–1849). She was the second-last child in a family of nine. After the death of her mother in 1849, the family moved to Wyk on the Frisian island of Föhr where her brother, Otto, had settled.

They lived in the Villa Idyle which Otto had built for his father and the three sisters who joined him. It was here that Caroline Hammer opened her photographic studio, with customers from the fashionable resort Wyk had become popular since Christian VIII visited the island in 1842.

Little is known about how Hammer became interested in photography or who taught her the art but her first works date to the 1860s. They were outdoor photographs of people on the beach and around the island, often including the fishing boats and the fishermen. Among the works which have been preserved are portraits of her family and several landscapes from the early 1870s. Her portraits of children are particularly memorable. It is assumed she continued to practice until she moved back to Zealand in the 1880s. In 1881, she became the first female member of the Dansk Fotografisk Forening, the Danish photographers' association.

In 1891, Hammer had a house built for her sisters and herself in Fredensborg. No longer a professional, she continued to take photographs of her house and garden.

Caroline Hammer died in Fredensborg on 12 January 1915.
