= Lubliner =

Lubliner may refer to:

- Hugo Lubliner
- Lubliner Sztyme
