= Otto Christian Hammer =

Royal Danish Navy officer and businessman (1822-1892)

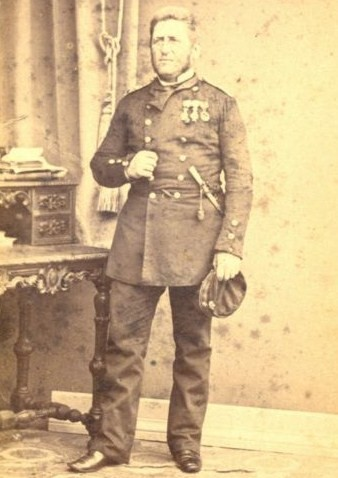
- Otto C. Hammer in 1864
- Born: 22 August 1822; Hulerød
- Died: 10 March 1892 (aged 69); Copenhagen
- Relatives: Caroline Hammer (sister); Sigurd Hammer (son)
- Military career
- Allegiance: Denmark
- Branch: Royal Danish Navy
- Service years: 1837–1854, 1864/65
- Rank: Commander
- Commands: Flotilla in the North Frisian Islands
- Conflicts: First Schleswig War; Second Schleswig War
- Awards: Order of the Dannebrog (Commander)
- Other work: Customs and lighthouse inspector; Fishery and lumber business

Commander Otto Christian Hammer (18 August 1822 – 10 March 1892) was a Royal Danish Navy officer and businessman who participated in the First Schleswig War and the Second Schleswig War.

After a successful campaign along the west coast of the Duchy of Schleswig in the First Schleswig War, Hammer became a lighthouse inspector but quit service with the navy only a few years later. When the Second Schleswig War broke out, Hammer enlisted again as an officer and lead a flotilla in the North Frisian Islands. Despite an early success against Austro-Prussian forces he was later captured by a hostile expeditionary corps.

Retiring again from military duties, Hammer became involved in politics and established a lumber and fishery business in Sweden. During that time he published his memoirs on the Second Schleswig War and also a text on fishery.

== Life ==
Born in Hulerød, Hammer was the son of District Commissioner and Inspector Frederik Abel Hammer (d. 1877) and Elisabeth Kirstine Lemvigh (1794–1849). On 28 February 1851 he wedded Henriette Jacobine Hastrup (b. 3 September 1830 on Hjortholm Castle), daughter of Julianus Jensen Hastrup (1780–1863), squire on Hjortholm from 1823 to 1863, and of Anna Cecilie Høffding (1791–1861).

In 1837 Hammer joined the Danish Naval Academy as a cadet and was promoted to Sub Lieutenant on 3 August 1843. On an expedition to qualm uprisings in the Danish colonies in Guinea in 1854, he led the expeditionary forces to Fort Prinsensten and negotiated with the locals.

During the First Schleswig War, Hammer served with a squadron that blocked traffic in the mouth of the river Elbe. In 1850 he became deputy commander of the squadron and operated from Fanø off the Danish west coast. His forces occupied the islands Nordstrand and Pellworm and Hammer took part in the defense of the then Danish towns of Tönning and Friedrichstadt. On 3 August 1851, he was promoted to Lieutenant. After the war he was made a customs and lighthouse inspector at the west coast of the Duchy of Schleswig. Although Hammer quit his naval service in 1854, he was granted the character of a Lieutenant Commander on 17 February 1858.

At the onset of the Second Schleswig War, Hammer enlisted again and commanded a flotilla of Danish naval units in the North Frisian Islands with his headquarters in Wyk auf Föhr. Initially, he successfully fought off superior Austro-Prussian forces. But when requested reinforcements did not arrive and his opponents were able to capture the island of Sylt and then Föhr, Hammer himself was taken prisoner by Prussian Lieutenant Ernst von Prittwitz und Gaffron on 19 July 1864 in Wyk, and was held captive until August of that year. His enemies described him as a "Viking who terrorised the land and the people (Land und Leute tyrannisierenden Wikinger)", while Danish-oriented parts of the population of the islands presented an honorary sabre to him.

Hammer returned from Austrian captivity in 1865 and took a seat in the Diet of Denmark. At the same time he also quit his public service and established a fishery business.

In 1882, he acquired a sizeable sawmill in Sweden. It was located in Gällö, Jämtland County. In 1885, his youngest son Sigurd came to Gällö to help his father with the sawmill. Sigurd was an engineer, which came in handy when the sawmill would be expanded. Sigurd became the first in the Hammer family to acquire Swedish citizenship 1885. On 6 April 1889, Otto Hammer was promoted to the character of Commander.

He had been ill for a long time so he and his wife returned from Gällö to Copenhagen in early 1892. Otto Christian Hammer died 10 March 1892. He is buried in Holmens Cemetery in Copenhagen.

His son Sigurd ran the sawmill until 1898 when it was sold. Sigurd moved shortly thereafter to Narvik in Norway to serve as Swedish consul.

== Publications ==
Hammer published a book on his experiences in the war of 1864:

- Vesterhavsøernes Forsvar i Aaret 1864 (The Defending of the North Sea Islands in the Year 1864), Copenhagen: 1865.

In 1872, he was awarded a gold medal by the Moscow Scientific Society for a treatise on fishery matters.

== Decorations ==
- Knight of the Order of the Dannebrog (28 December 1850)
- Silver Cross of the Order of the Dannebrog (3 August 1860)
- Commander of the Order of the Dannebrog (30 September 1864)

== Legacy ==
- Hammers Trafikskole, "Hammer's Traffic School", in Rødby was named after him.
- In 1975 a Danish patrol boat (P 542) was named Hammer after him.
- "Hammersminni", a street name in Djúpivogur, East Iceland is named after him.
