= Meir Balaban =

Polish historian (1877–1942)

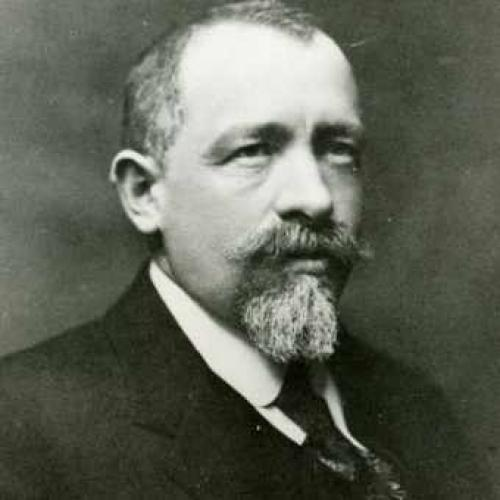
- Meir Balaban
- Born: 3 March 1877; Lemberg, Austria-Hungary
- Died: 26 December 1942 (aged 65); Warsaw Ghetto, General Government, Germany

Meir Balaban or Majer Samuel Bałaban (3 March [O.S. 19 February] 1877, 18 Adar [5]637 – 26 December 1942, Tevet [5]702) was a historian of Polish and Galician Jews, and the founder of Polish Jewish historiography.

== Early years ==
Balaban was born in 1877 in the city of Lviv (then known as Lemberg in Austria-Hungary's centre of East Galicia). He received a traditional education at home and traditional Jewish schooling (Hebrew language and Bible study) in a cheder.

== Biography and initial studies on Jewish history ==
He studied law, philosophy and history at Lviv University. He accidentally encountered materials on the history of Jews in Kraków, and on the request of the Kraków Jewish kahal, he wrote the first volume of "The History of Jews in Cracow and Kazimiria 1304-1655" (Kraków, 1912). It gave him some reputation in Lviv University. Balaban then won a high ministry scholarship, and departed for a long scientific trip to Poznań, Berlin and Gdańsk. He stayed for several months in Kraków collecting materials for the second volume of the history of Kraków Jews. Simultaneously he started the publication "The history of Jewish system in Poland" in "Evreiskaia Starina" ("Jewish Old Times", as translated from Russian) magazine. He taught in different schools in the Lviv region and Lviv combining studying with teaching and research. He spent the first year of World War I in Vienna teaching at the gymnasium for Galician refugees. The next three years, he spent in Lublin as a referent (reporter) on Jewish matters by the Austrian General Government. At these posts, he organised many Jewish kahals and gymnasiums. Together with Ozjasz Thon and Dr. Moses Schorr, Balaban was one of the founders of the Institute of Jewish Sciences in Warsaw. Here Balaban taught Jewish history and led the historical seminar which issued many works on the history of Jews in Poland and in particular in the Polish kingdom. Balaban had also published "The history of Jews in Galicia" in 1916. Since 1903 Balaban led the review of the bibliography of the history of Jews in Poland in the Polish historical magazine "Kwartalnik historyczny" ("History Quarterly"). During nine years Balaban had been administering the Tachkemoni Rabbinical Seminary (1920–1929) and for 1920-1921 he had been also the rector of the gymnasium "Askola".

The fate of Balaban was also tragic like Schorr's one. He died in the Warsaw Ghetto on 26 December 1942.

== Works on the history of Polish Jews ==
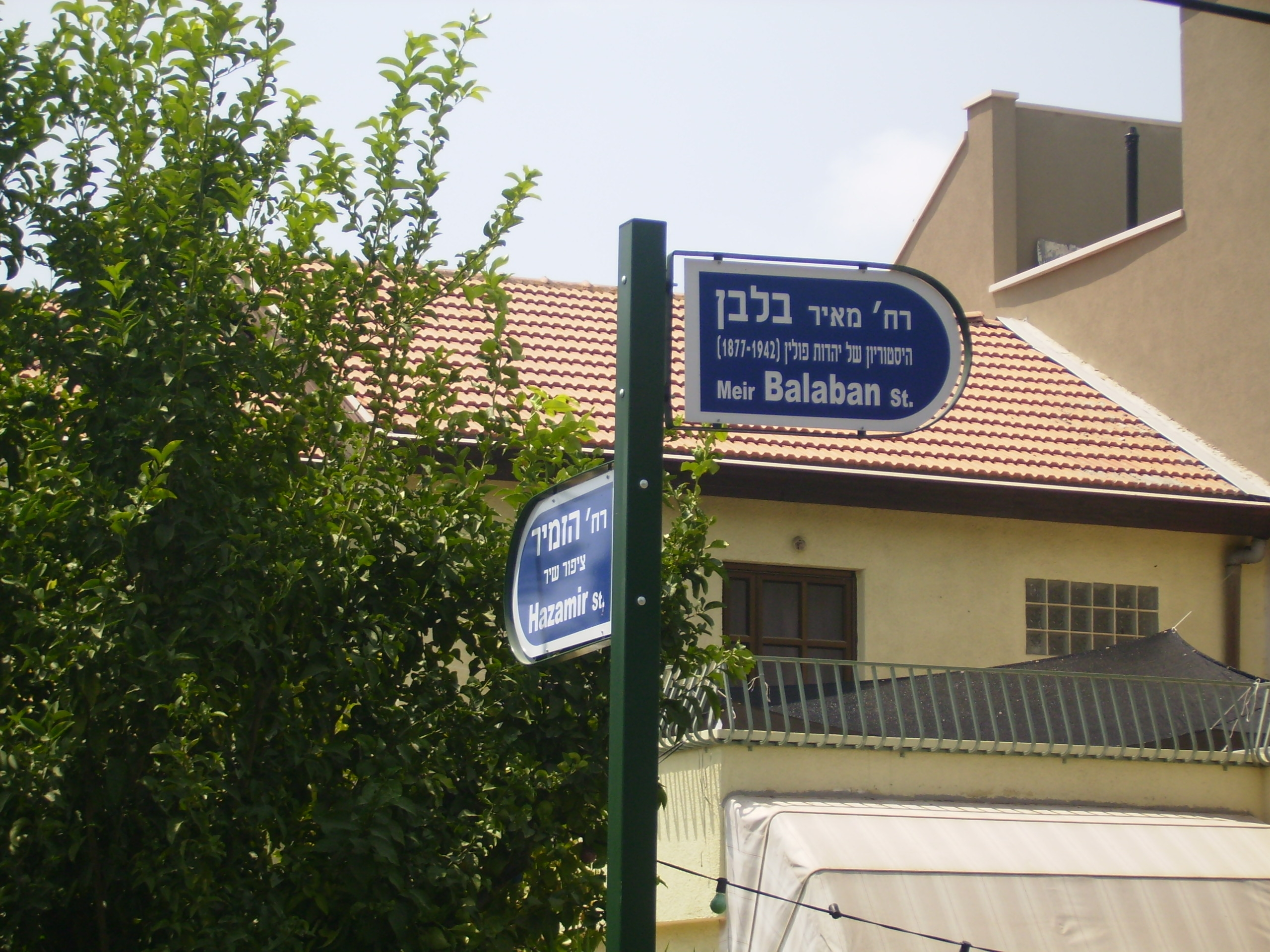
Meir Balaban commemorated in a street's name in Holon, Israel

He was the first outstanding historian of Polish Jewry and he is fairly considered as the founder of the historiography of Polish Jews. Among his works the most important ones are:

- Jews of Lvov (Lemberg) on the eve of 17th century (1916);
- History of Jews of Cracow (2 vols, 1931)
- Jewry of Lublin (1919).

He wrote also a detailed article about the Vaad of four lands for the 11th volume of "History of Jewish people". He published hundreds of articles which are devoted to the researches of rabbis', scholars', community leaders' activities as well as the history of bloody pogroms, about the Karaims in Poland and other topics. All they were published mostly in German, Polish or in Yiddish. Balaban's researches written in Hebrew on the history of movements of Shabatai Zwi and Jakob Frank are especially important to note. They are resumed in his book "Le toldot ha-tnua ha-frankit" (The history of the Frank movement, 2 vols., 1934–1935). It was published in Tel Aviv. Balaban had written also "The history of the progressive synagogue in Lvov" (in polish original "Historia postępowej synagogi we Lwowie") as well as "The Bibliography of the history of Jews in Poland during 1900-1930" which encompasses more than 10.000 entries.

Since 1906 he published many scientific articles in the newspaper "Kurjer Lwowski". The first more essential essays appeared in the almanac "Rocznik Żydowske" in 1902-1906:

- "Izak Nachmanovicz, Żyd Lwowski XVI wieku" (Izak Nachmanowicz - a Polish Jew of the 16th Century);
- "Josefus Flavius, Charakterystyka czlowieka i historyka na tle wspolczesnych wypadkow" (Josephus Flavius. A Characterization of a Person and a Historian on the Background of the Contemporary Events, 1904);
- "Makabeusze" (Maccabees, 1905);
- "Lewko Balaban, burmistrz kahalny Lwowski z konca XVIII wieku" (Lewko Balaban (Leo Balaban), the Kahal Burgmeister of Lviv of the End of the 17th Century).

Some of these articles became the preparation for the mentioned already Balaban's work entitled "Żydzi Lwowscy na przelomie XVI i XVII wieku" (Jews of Lvov in the break of the 16th and 17th centuries, 1906, 577 pages of the text and 188 pages of the materials). Balaban was awarded the first premium of Ipolit Wawelberg for this work. The work consists of 3 parts. In the first part Balaban depicts the live history of the external events of the community, discussing in details the clamorous deal of Lviv Jews with Jesuits and the eager leaders of the community of the Nachman family; the second part is devoted to the detailed contemplation over the community self-administration and the Rabbinate and the last part consists of a few essays about the trade, crafts, family life, and like that. Balaban used rich archival data of the Archive of Bernardines in Lviv as well as of the Lviv City Archive and the Archive of Jewish Community in Lviv.

== Memory ==
One of the streets in the downtown of Lviv, Ukraine is named after him (Mayer Balaban Street, Lviv). There are also streets named after him in Israel, in Holon for example.

== Bibliography of Balaban's publications ==
- Balaban, M. Historja i literatura żydowska ze szczególnem uwzglednieniem historji Żydow w Polsce (Jewish history and culture with the detailed review of the history of Jews in Poland). Lwów–Kraków, 1921 OCLC 69595105.
- Balaban, M. Przewodnik po żydowskich zabytkach Krakowa z 13 rycinami z 24 rytograwjurami na oddzielnych tablicach z 2 planami (Guide on Jewish places and monuments of Kraków). Kraków: KAW, 1990 OCLC 773284.
- Balaban, M. Smutna rocznica (Sorrowful anniversary), Chwila (Zionist daily), Lviv, 30 July 1920.
- Balaban, M. Dr. Emanuel de Jona, lekarz nadworny Jana Trzecigo (Dr. Emmanuel de Jona, court physician of John III Sobieski, Chwila, Lvov, 4 March 1920.
- Balaban, M. Z wczorajszego Lwowa (From the past of Lvov), Chwila (Zionist daily), Lviv, July - December 1925.
- Balaban, M. Chassidica. Przeglad literatury o chasydyzmie z lat ostatnich (Hassidica. Review of recent literature about the Hassidism). Chwila (Zionist daily), Lviv, Daily no.: 7--9, 11, 12, 14, 16–19 July 1932.
- Balaban, M. Budowa i ornamentyka synagog w Polsce (Structure and ornamentation of synagogues in Poland), Chwila (Zionist daily), Lviv, 30 December 1925.
- Balaban, M. Do dziejow Ormian lwowskich. Traktat o asymilacyi (Concerning the history of Armenians in Lvov. Treatise about the assimilation), Chwila (Zionist daily), Lviv, 14 January 1921.
- Balaban, M. Napoleon a Żydzi (Napoleon and the Jews), Chwila (Zionist daily), Lviv, 30 December 1925.
- Balaban, M. Żydzi polsko-litewscy w pierwszym roku wojny europejskiej 1914-1915. Przegląd bibliograficzny (Polish Lithuanian Jews in the first year of European War 1914-1915. Bibliographical review). In "Chwila", August - September 1922.
- Balaban, M. Auto da Fe w Lwowie w r. 1728 (Auto da Fe in Lvov in 1728), Chwila, 14 January 1921.
- Balaban, M. Drukarnie hebrajskie w Żółkwi i Lwowie (Hebrew printing shops in Żółkiew and Lvov). In "Chwila" (Zionist daily), Lviv, 11 April 1920.
- Balaban, M. Nauka Żydowska w Golusie i jej dom w Ojczyźnie (Jewish Science in the Dispersion and its House in Motherland) in "Chwila" (Zionist daily), Lviv, 2 April 1925, pp. 9–11.
- Balaban, M. Żydowska biblioteka gminna we Lwowie. Wspomnienie. (Jewish Communal Library in Lvov - Recollections) in "Chwila" (Zionist daily), Lviv, 7 January 1922, p. 2.
- Balaban, M. Chassidica, przegląd literatury o chasydyzmie z lat ostatnich (Chassidica, the review of the literature on Hassidism from the last years) in "Chwila" (Zionist daily), Lvov, August–September 1922.
- Balaban, M. Korespondencja Lublinera z Lewelem (Correspondence of Lubliner with Lewel) in "Miesięcznik Żydowski" (Poland's Jewish monthly), no. 4, 1933, pp. 289–321.
- Balaban, M. Zalmaw, burmistrz kahalu w Drohobyczu w pol. XVII w. (Zalmaw - Jewish community mayor of Drohobycz) in "Dziennik Polski" (Polish daily), January 1900.
