= Kaskel =

Kaskel is a surname of German origin. Notable people with the surname include:

- Alfred Kaskel (1901–1968), American real estate developer and hotelier
- Walter Kaskel (1882-1928), German jurist
