= Sigurd Hammer =

Swedish Consul to Norway

Sigurd Hammer (1862–1945) was a Swedish Consul to Norway.

Born in Wyk auf Föhr as the youngest son of O. C. Hammer, Hammer was the first in his family to get Swedish citizenship when he moved to Gällö in Jämtland in 1885. Hammer was a trained engineer and helped his father with the expansion of the Gällö sawmill. He moved to Norway in 1899, where he worked as a Swedish Consul and as the French General Agent for the Narvik Iron Ore Line.

In 1896, he married Hilma Lindh (b. 20 March 1864) from Mora, Sweden. After the dissolution of the Swedish-Norwegian union in 1905, Hammer moved to Tromsø, and later to Christiania around 1911. His marriage remained without child and the couple was divorced in 1914. The same year, Hammer married Benedicte Jabobsen, who was born in 1891 in Tysfjord Municipality, Norway. They had three sons, Frits Annar Bent (born in 1914), Sigurd Otto Henry (born in 1915), and Benny Thor (born in 1920 in Denmark). In 1928 Sigurd Hammer completed a book about his father O.C Hammer with his brother Regnar.

Hammer moved to Stockholm in 1917 and lived there until his death on 4/1 1945.
