= Stine Andresen =

German poet (1849–1927)

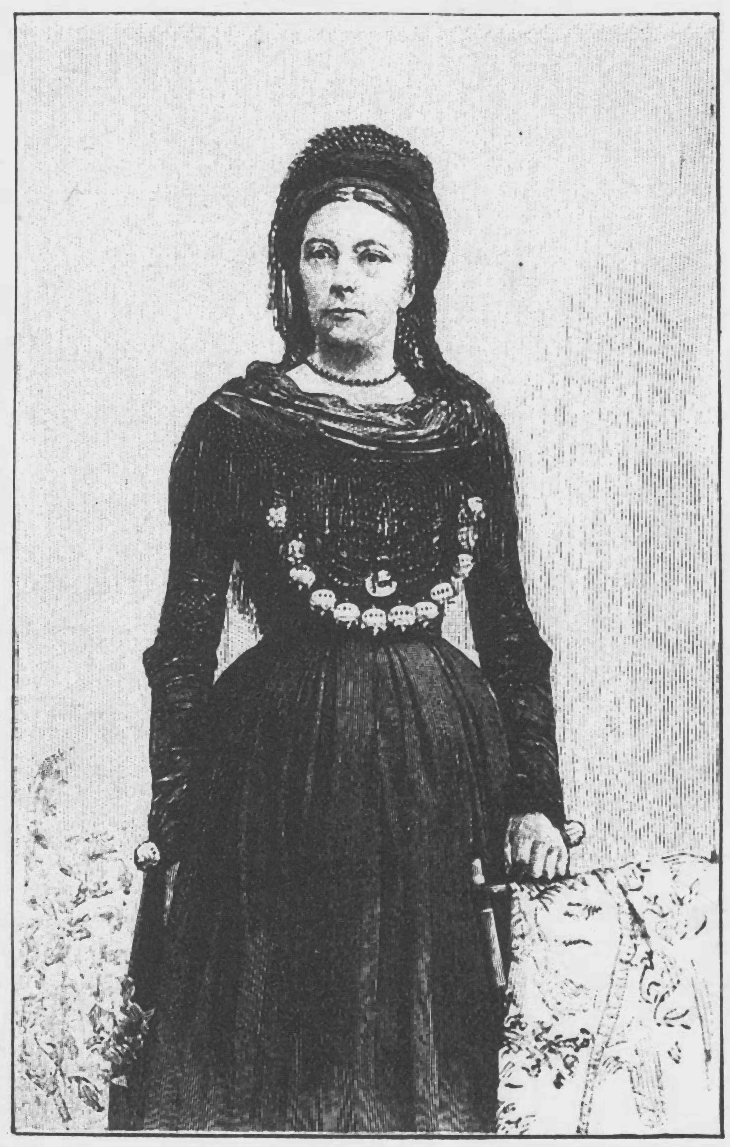
- Andresen (ca. 1890)
- Born: Stine Jürgens; 1849; Boldixum, Föhr, Duchy of Schleswig
- Died: 1927 (aged 77–78); Wyk auf Föhr, Germany
- Resting place: Wyk auf Föhr
- Occupation: Poet
- Writing career
- Language: German, Fering
- Genres: Poetry, prose

Stine Andresen (née Jürgens) (1849–1927) was a German poet from the North Frisian island of Föhr. Her lyrics often refer to her native island. In addition to poems in German, she wrote some poetry in Fering North Frisian.

== Life and opus ==
Stine Andresen was born to farmer Jürgen Erich Jürgens in Boldixum (now a part of Wyk auf Föhr) and spent most of her life there. Her mother died early. Andresen attended grammar school in Boldixum and improved her education by reading. Quite early she used to write occasional poems which were recited upon festivities. She was friendly with the family of poet Friedrich Hebbel, and after his death worked as a secretary for Hebbel's widow Christine for some time.

In 1875 she married miller Emil Andresen who died during the 1890s. Already in 1893 poems by Stine Andresen were printed and published. When her financial situation worsened due to the death of her husband, the author Karl Schrattenthal supported her by reprinting her works.

== Reception and aftermath ==
Two of her works were set to music for choir by composer Ferdinand Thieriot. The town of Wyk auf Föhr named a street "Stine-Andresen-Weg".

== Honours ==
- 1917 - Friedrich Hebbel Prize
- 1918 - Friedrich Hebbel Prize (together with Hans Groß)
- 1919 - Friedrich Hebbel Prize (together with Hans Groß)
- 1920 - Friedrich Hebbel Prize (together with Hans Groß)

== Selected works ==
- Schrattenthal, K., ed. (1896). Gesammelte Gedichte [Collection of Poems] (3rd ed.).
- Enziana - Ein Blumenmärchen [Enziana - a Flower's Tale]. Nordfriesische Verlagsanstalt.
- Neue Gedichte [New Poems]. Buchhandlung der Anstalt Bethel. 1903.
- Gedichte aus dem bisher unveröffentlichten Nachlaß der inselfriesischen Dichterin [Poems from the previously unpublished Estate of the Insular-Frisian Poet]. Nordfriesische Verlagsanstalt Carl Meyer. 1930.

=== Letters ===
- Langner, Martin-M., ed. (1989). Briefe und Gedichte [Letters and Poems] (2nd ed.). Weidler. ISBN 3-925191-50-X.

== Bibliography ==
- Brümmer, Franz (1913). Lexikon der deutschen Dichter und Prosaisten vom Beginn des 19. Jahrhunderts bis zur Gegenwart [Encyclopaedia of German Poets and Prose Writers from the Beginning of the 19th Century until Present] (in German). Leipzig: Reclam. p. 63.
- Friedrichs, Elisabeth (1981). Die deutschsprachigen Schriftstellerinnen des 18. und 19. Jahrhunderts. Ein Lexikon [Female German Language Authors of the 18th and 19th Century. An Encyclopaedia]. Stuttgart: Metzler. p. 6.
- Zacchi, Uwe (1986). Menschen von Föhr - Lebenswege aus drei Jahrhunderten [People from Föhr - Vitae of three Centuries]. Boyens.
- Tholund, Jakob (1991). Vom Schatz der Lieder. Stine Andresen - eine Dichterin von Föhr [On the Treasure of Song. Stine Andresen - a poet from Föhr]. Husum Druck- und Verlagsgesellschaft. ISBN 3-88042-564-7.
