= Carl Haeberlin =

German physician and natural historian

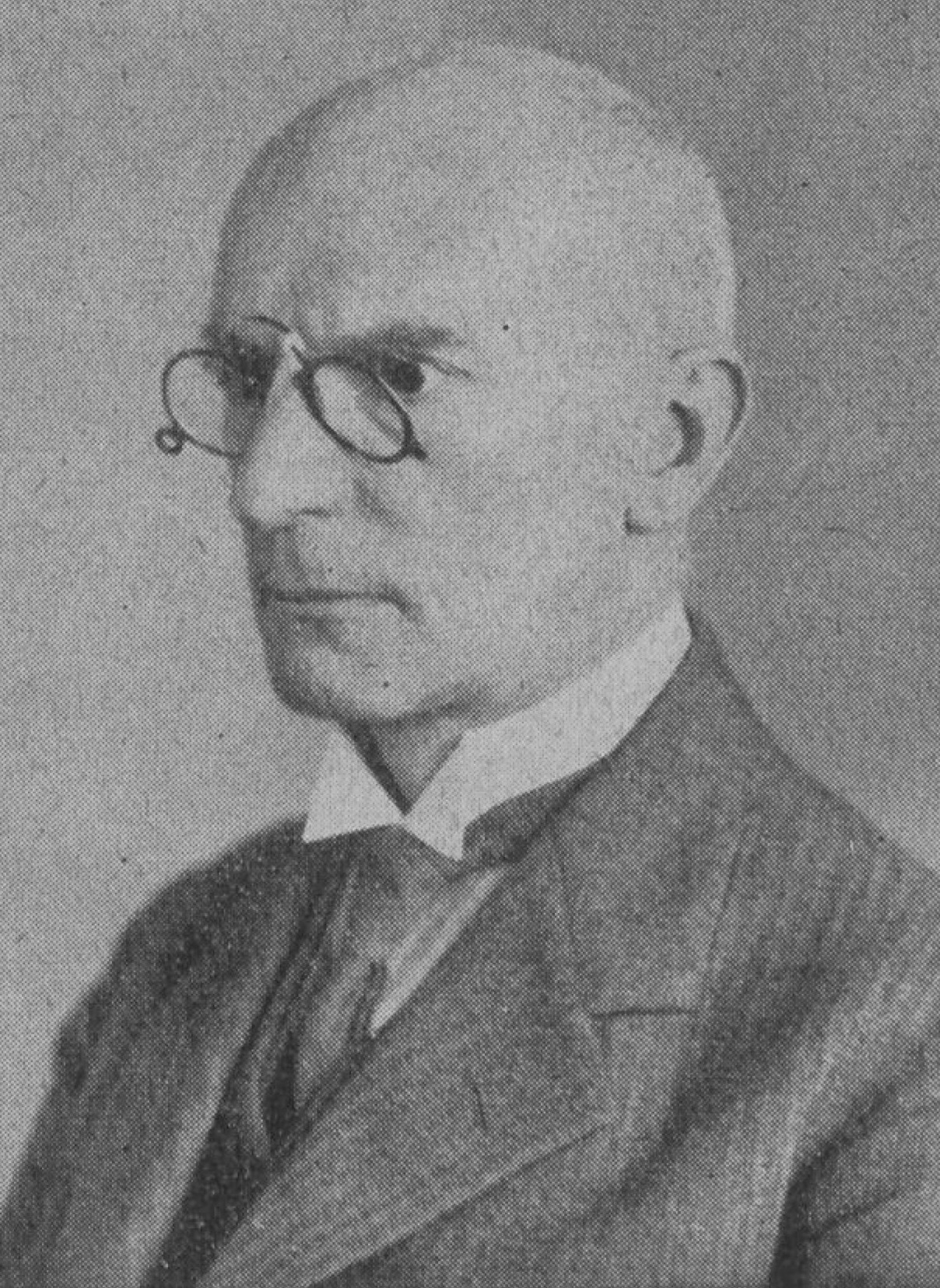
Carl Haeberlin

Carl Haeberlin (15 December 1870 – 12 November 1954), sometimes also spelled Häberlin, was a German physician and natural historian. He was influential in the development of climatotherapy and thalassotherapy in Germany and founded the Dr. Carl-Häberlin-Friesenmuseum in Wyk auf Föhr. He is not to be confused with the German psychologist Carl Haeberlin (1878–1947).

== Biography ==
Haeberlin was born in Ranchi, India, as the son of a Christian missionary. The family moved back to Germany in 1873 and settled in Swabia where Carl Haeberlin spent his youth.

He studied medicine, passed his exams in 1895 in Tübingen and received a doctorate. In 1902, he moved to Wyk auf Föhr on Föhr island in the North Sea where he began to practice. Apart from activities as a balneologist he also worked intensively on climatotherapy and thalassotherapy. His studies and reports formed the basis for the development of these disciplines in Germany. Together with Karl Gmelin he established a centre for bioclimatic research in Wyk auf Föhr which opened in 1926. Already in the early 1900s, Gmelin's and Haeberlin's activities attracted increasing numbers of tourists to the seaside spa of Wyk which had previously been less frequented.

In 1902 and 1919 he published two chronicles of the town of Wyk and Wyk as a seaside resort respectively. A museum of natural history and local history in Wyk that he had founded in 1908 was named Dr. Carl-Haeberlin-Museum in his honour in 1927. The museum displays artifacts from the Viking Age, the Age of Sail, and paintings with local motives.

Carl Haeberlin died in 1954 in Wyk auf Föhr. He was survived by his wife Leonore who died on 27 April 1994 aged 94.

== Awards and honours ==
Haeberlin was granted an honorary professorship in 1946. In 1954, he was awarded the Commander's Cross of Merit of the Federal Republic of Germany. The town of Wyk named a street in his honour.
