= Henriette May =

German Jewish women's activist (1862–1928)

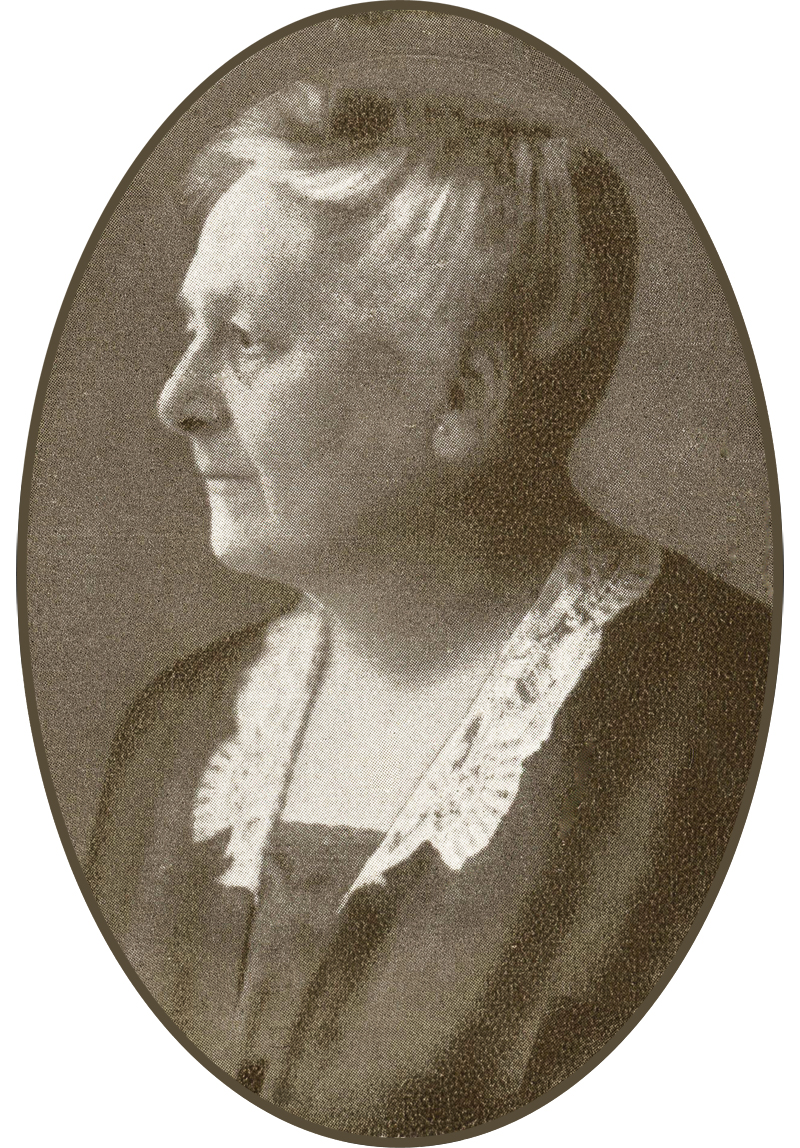
Henriette May

Henriette May née Lövinson (1862–1928) was a German Jewish women's activist and educator. She is remembered, together with Bertha Pappenheim and Sidonie Werner, as a co-founder of Germany's League of Jewish Women in 1904.

== Biography ==
Born in Berlin on 25 March 1862, she attended a teacher training seminary, after which she taught in Berlin and London. On 15 June 1904, together with Bertha Pappenheim and Sidonie Werner, in connection with an international women's congress in Berlin, she was a co-founder of the League of German Women. She served as a board member, promoting the protection of women and children and fighting against their trafficking. She went on to establish homes for orphaned children from the pogroms.

In 1923, she attended the First World Congress of Jewish Women in Vienna, reporting on the assistance provided to women and orphaned children by the Hilfsverein der deutschen Juden(Relief Organization of German Jews).

May was a leading member of various welfare institutions, especially those providing shelter for the homeless, for assisting German Jews, and for providing support to Jewish women and children. She was the first woman to serve on the board of the Central Verein Deutscher Staatsbürger Jüdischen Glaubens (Central Union of German Citizens of the Jewish Faith), which she co-founded in 1918.

Henriette May died in Berlin on 14 May 1928.
