= Ernst von Prittwitz und Gaffron =

German general (1833–1904)

Ernst Karl Ferdinand von Prittwitz und Gaffron
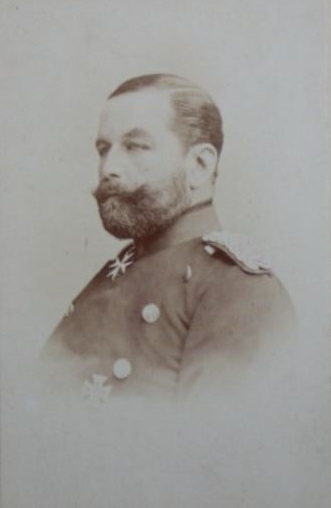
- Born: 20 January 1833; Posen, Prussia
- Died: 24 February 1904 (aged 71); Karlsruhe, Grand Duchy of Baden, German Empire
- Military career
- Allegiance: Prussia
- Branch: Prussian Army
- Service years: 1851–1890
- Rank: Lieutenant General
- Unit: Guard Artillery
- Conflicts: Second Schleswig War: Battle of Als; Austro-Prussian War; Franco-Prussian War: Gravelotte; Battle of Sedan
- Awards: Order of the Red Eagle; Order of the Crown; Several non-Prussian orders of chivalry

Ernst Karl Ferdinand von Prittwitz und Gaffron (20 January 1833 – 24 February 1904) was a Royal Prussian Lieutenant General and Knight of Justice of the Order of Saint John.

== Family and private life ==
Von Prittwitz was born in Posen, Prussia (modern Poznań, Poland), he originated from the old noble house of von Prittwitz and was the son of Prussian General of the Infantry and Director of Fortifications Moritz Karl Ernst von Prittwitz and of Domicilie von Colbe.

On 26 November 1885 he married Franziska Freiin von Türckheim zu Altdorf (b. 14 June 1855 in Karlsruhe; d. 8 May 1936 ibidem), daughter of Grand Ducal Badenese Chamberlain, envoy and land owner Hans Freiherr von Türckheim zu Altdorf, Lord of Altdorf and Orschweier (Lahr District, Baden), and of Fanny Freiin von Hardenberg (House of Ober-Wiederstedt).

Von Prittwitz was a Knight of Justice in the Order of Saint John (Bailiwick of Brandenburg). He died in Karlsruhe.

== Military career ==
In 1851 von Prittwitz joined the Guard Artillery in Berlin, became Second Lieutenant in 1853 and First Lieutenant in 1861. In the Second Schleswig War against Denmark he was assigned to General Helmuth von Moltke the Elder, Chief of Staff of the Prussian Army. Here he participated in Wyk auf Föhr in the capture of Otto Christian Hammer and on 29 June 1864 took part in the crossing of the sound to the isle of Als.

Promoted to Captain with 32 years of age in 1865, he commanded a battery of Guard Artillery at Berlin since 1867.

At the onset of the Austro-Prussian War of 1866 he was commander of a mounted Guard battery and as such participated in the campaign in Bohemia. This battery was assigned to the newly formed Hanoverian Field Artillery Regiment No. 10. Prittwitz was thus deployed to Hanover in autumn 1866 but only after three quarters of a year he returned to Berlin.

After the war Prittwitz undertook a number of journeys abroad, including England, France, Spain and Italy, and in 1869 he went to Romania as counselor of Prince Frederick III of Hohenzollern with whom he travelled a part of the Orient.

In the Franco-Prussian War Prittwitz took part in the battles of Gravelotte, Sedan —here he was wounded by a grenade— and in the conquest of Montmédy. His battery was the first to reach the hill of St. Privat near Gravelotte and fiercely fought the French, which not only caused designated emperor Wilhelm I, but also Napoleon III to congratulate.

He was promoted to Major in 1872, became Colonel in 1883 and was made commanding officer of the 7th field artillery brigade in 1886. A Major General since 1888, Prittwitz retired in 1890.

== Honours ==
Prittwitz was made an honorary citizen of Wyk auf Föhr.

=== Orders and decorations ===
- Prussia:
  - Knight of the Red Eagle, 4th Class with Swords, 14 November 1864; 3rd Class with Bow and Swords on Ring, 26 September 1883; 2nd Class
  - Knight of the Royal Crown Order, 4th Class with Swords, 20 September 1866; 3rd Class with Swords on Ring, 18 January 1879; 2nd Class
  - Iron Cross (1870), 1st Class
  - Knight of Honour of the Johanniter Order, 1872; Knight of Justice, 1876
  - Service Award Cross
- Hohenzollern: Cross of Honour of the Princely House Order of Hohenzollern, 3rd Class with Swords
- Duchy of Anhalt: Commander of the Order of Albert the Bear, 2nd Class, 1877
- Baden: Knight of the Zähringer Lion, 1st Class with Oak Leaves, 1877
- Brunswick: Knight of the Order of Henry the Lion, 1st Class
- Grand Duchy of Hesse: Commander of the Merit Order of Philip the Magnanimous, 2nd Class, 12 September 1884
- Principality of Lippe: Cross of Honour of the House Order of Lippe, 1st Class
- Mecklenburg: Commander of the Wendish Crown
- Oldenburg: Commander of Honour of the Order of Duke Peter Friedrich Ludwig
- Saxe-Weimar-Eisenach: Commander of the White Falcon
- Kingdom of Saxony: Commander of the Albert Order, 2nd Class
- Württemberg: Commander of the Friedrich Order, 2nd Class
- Austrian Empire: Commander of the Order of Franz Joseph
- Kingdom of Italy: Commander of Saints Maurice and Lazarus
- Ottoman Empire: Order of the Medjidie, 4th Class
- Principality of Romania: Commander of the Star of Romania, 1869
- Russian Empire:
  - Knight of St. Anna, 2nd Class
  - Knight of St. Stanislaus, 2nd Class with Swords
- Spain:
  - Knight's Cross of the Order of Charles III
  - Knight of the Military Merit Order, 2nd Class
- Tunisia: Grand Officer of the Order of Glory

== Bibliography ==
- Almanach de Gotha, Adelige Häuser A Band. VI (in German), p 334, vol. 29 in total, C. A. Starke Verlag, Limburg (Lahn) 1962, ISSN 0435-2408.
- Von Prittwitz, Robert: "Das v. Prittwitz'sche Adels-Geschlecht" (The noble House of von Prittwitz) (in German), p. 145f., Verlag Wilh. Gottl. Korn, Breslau 1870.
