= Rudolph Lennhoff =

German medical expert

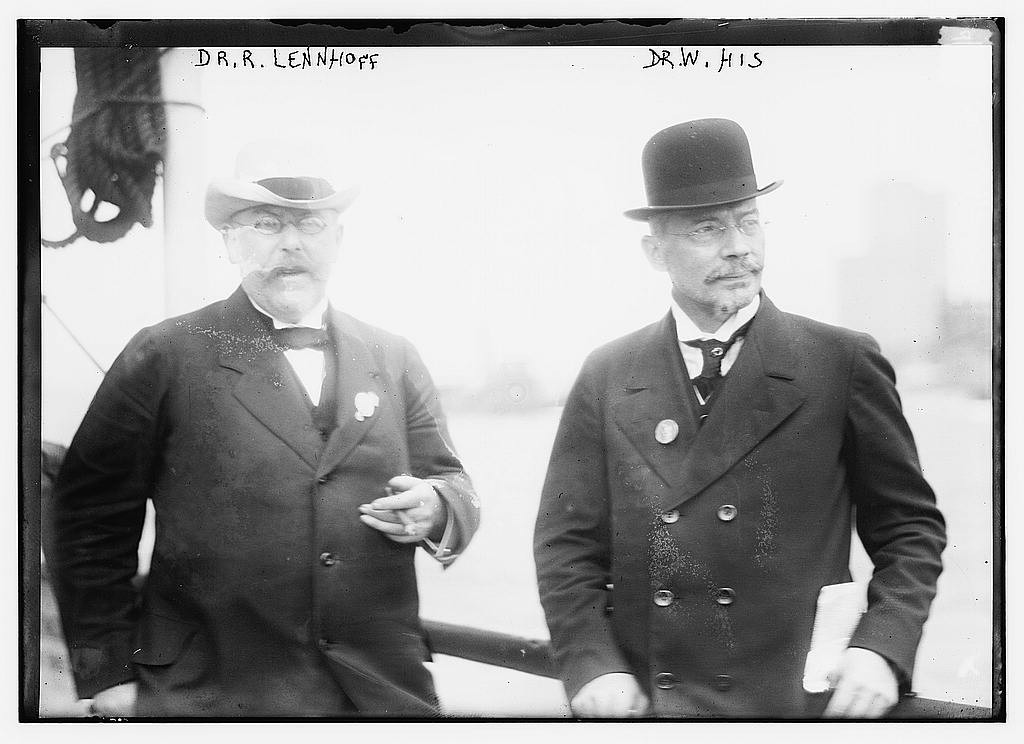
Rudolph Lennhoff and Wilhelm His Jr. in 1912 in Manhattan

Rudolph Lennhoff (14 July 1866 – 25 December 1933) was one of the best known medical authorities in Berlin.

== Biography ==
Lennhoff was born in Lüdenscheid, Germany.

Following an investigation into the conditions of working-class people with tuberculosis, undertaken jointly with Wolf Becher, Lennhof devised the open air cure that became the standard treatment for the disease for many decades.

He also discovered what became known as "Lennhof's sign", a furrow that appears between the liver and the bottom rib when the patient breathes in, indicating the presence of an ecchinoccus cyst.

In 1912, he attended the 15th International Congress on Hygiene and Demography, which opened 23 September 1912, in Washington, D.C.

A liberal in his political views, Lennhof contributed to the liberal daily Vossische Zeitung and was a member of the Freisinniger Volkspartei. He was also one of the organisers, in 1905, of the Society for Social Medicine.

He died on 25 December 1933 in Berlin, Germany.

== Works ==
- Die Ärzte. In: Handbuch der Politik, Berlin und Leipzig 1914
