= Wilhelm Eduard Wilda =

German jurist (1800–1856)

- Born: Wolf Ephraim Seligmann; 17 August 1800; Altona, Holstein, Germany
- Died: 9 August 1856 (aged 55); Kiel, Holstein, Germany
- Occupation: Jurist

Wilhelm Eduard Wilda (17 August 1800 – 9 August 1856) was a German jurist of Jewish descent.

He was educated at the Johanneum of Hamburg and the universities of Göttingen, Heidelberg, Kiel, and Copenhagen. The year 1826 was passed partly in Berlin and partly in travel through Germany, France, and Switzerland. After practicing as an attorney at Hamburg from 1826 to 1830, he was appointed assistant professor at Halle, where he remained until 1842, when he was called to Breslau as full professor. In 1854 he was transferred to Kiel.

Wilda, who was the founder of comparative jurisprudence, was the author of the following works: Das Gildewesen im Mittelalter (Halle, 1831; 2d ed., Berlin, 1838); and Das Strafrecht der Germanen (Halle, 1842), a volume forming the second part of his Geschichte des Deutschen Rechtes. In 1838 he founded, in collaboration with August Ludwig Reyscher, the Zeitschrift für Deutsches Recht, which was published first at Tübingen and later at Leipzig, and was discontinued in 1861.
