= Andreas Martinius Andersen =

Norwegian civil servant (born 1903)

- Born: 24 September 1903; Kristiansand, Norway
- Died: 27 June 1976 (aged 72)
- Occupation: Civil servant
- Awards: Order of the Polar Star

Andreas Martinius Andersen (24 September 1903 – 27 June 1976) was a Norwegian civil servant.

Andersen was born in Kristiansand to physician Kristen Cæcillius Andersen and Henriette Kristine Usterud. He graduated as cand.philol. in 1931, and lectured at Oslo Cathedral School and secondary schools in Stabekk and Tønsberg until 1946. From 1946 to 1950 he worked for Arbeidernes Opplysningsforbund, and from 1950 to 1953 he was appointed rector at the civilian schools of the Norwegian Army. He was assigned Secretary of State at the Ministry of Defence from 1951 to 1952, and director of civil protection from 1953, reporting to the Prime Minister. He chaired the coordination committee of the Norwegian Intelligence Service and the Norwegian Police Security Service from 1953. From 1956 he served as deputy under-secretary of state (Norwegian: ekspedisjonssjef) of Civil Protection at the Office of the Prime Minister.

He was elected member of the municipal council of Sem Municipality from 1937 to 1940 and from 1945 to 1946, and was a member of the Broadcasting Council from 1954 to 1963. He was decorated Commander of the Swedish Order of the Polar Star, and Commander with Star of the Order of the Yugoslav Flag. He died at the age of 72.
