= Lubliner Sztyme =

Former Yiddish newspaper in Poland

- Type: weekly newspaper
- Political alignment: General Jewish Labour Bund
- Language: Yiddish
- Headquarters: Lublin
- Country: interbellum Poland

Lubliner Sztyme (Yiddish: לובלינער שטימע, "Lublin Voice") was a Yiddish-language weekly newspaper in interbellum Poland, published in Lublin. Lubliner Sztyme was an organ of the General Jewish Labour Bund in Poland.
