= Kurt Sternberg =

German philosopher and author (1885–1942)

Kurt Max Julius Sternberg (19 June 1885 – 21 September 1942) was a Neo-Kantian German philosopher, author, and Holocaust victim.

== Biography ==
Sternberg was born in Berlin, studied with the Neo-Kantian philosophers Alois Riehl and Friedrich Paulsen, and published on academic philosophy and liberal politics. Sternberg engaged in Neo-Kantian debates over the natural sciences (Naturwissenschaften) and cultural sciences (Kulturwissenschaften) in Zur Logik der Geschichtswissenschaft (1914). He rejected the pessimism of Oswald Spengler in Idealismus und Kultur (1923). He also wrote works on literary and political figures such as Gerhart Hauptmann, Heinrich Heine, and Walther Rathenau. Later works in 1933 and 1938 discussed philosophical issues in the Bible and Judaism.

Sternberg, who was Jewish, fled to the Netherlands in 1939 to escape National Socialism. He was detained and sent to the Westerbork concentration camp and from there, to Auschwitz, where he was murdered in September 1942.

There is a Stolperstein in memory of Sternberg at Uhlandstraße 175 in the Charlottenburg neighborhood of Berlin.

== Selected works ==
- Versuch einer Entwicklungsgeschichte des kantischen Denkens bis zur Grundlegung des Kritizismus (1909) (in German)
- Zur Logik der Geschichtswissenschaft (1914) (in German)
- Einführung in die Philosophie vom Standpunkt des Kritizismus (1919) (in German)
- Staatsphilosophie (1923) (in German)
- Idealismus und Kultur (1923) (in German)
- Neukantische Aufgaben (1931) (in German)
- Die Geburt des Etwas aus dem Nichts, Pan-Verlagsgesellschaft, Berlin (1933) (in German)
- Philosophische Probleme im biblischen und apokryphen Schrifttum der Juden, Berlin, Goldstein (1938) (in German)
