= Gällö =

- Location within Jämtland Location within Sweden
- Coordinates: 62°55′N 15°14′E
- Country: Sweden
- Province: Jämtland
- County: Jämtland County
- Municipality: Bräcke Municipality

Area
  - Total: 1.23 km^{2} (0.47 sq mi)

Population (31 December 2020)
  - Total: 692
  - Density: 564/km^{2} (1,460/sq mi)
- Time zone: UTC+1 (CET)
  - Summer (DST): UTC+2 (CEST)

Gällö is a locality situated in Bräcke Municipality, Jämtland County, Sweden with 692 inhabitants in 2020. The locality is located next to the E14 road, as well as the Central line railway. The Norrtåg regional trains stops at the Gällö railway station.
