= Walter Kaskel =

Carl John Walter Kaskel (February 2, 1882, Berlin - October 9, 1928, Berlin) was a German jurist. He studied legal science in Berlin, Munich and Freiburg im Breisgau.

== Literary works ==
- editor of the "Neue Zeitschrift für Arbeitsrecht", 1921-
- editor of the "Monatsschrift für Arbeiter-und Angestelltenversicherung", 1913-
- Grundriss des sozialen Rechts, 1912 (with Friedrich Sitzler)
- Die rechtliche Natur des Arbeiterschutzes, 1914
- Das neue Arbeitsrecht, 1920

== Literature ==
- Jürgen Nürnberger: Walter Kaskel : Leben und Werk 1882-1928. Ludwigshafen : JNV, 2008. [In progress].
