= Sidonie Werner =

German Jewish feminist

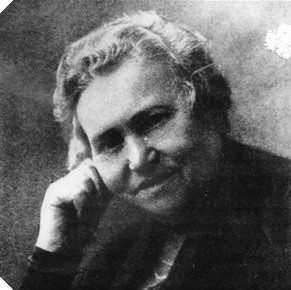
- Sidonie Werner
- Born: March 16, 1860; Posen, Kingdom of Prussia
- Died: December 27, 1932 (aged 72); Bad Segeberg, Weimar Germany

Sidonie Werner (16 March 1860 – 27 December 1932) was a German Jewish schoolteacher and feminist based in Hamburg. She was active in the German League of Jewish Women which she founded in 1904, together with Bertha Pappenheim. In 1929, she organized the World Conference of Jewish Women in Hamburg.

== Biography ==
Born in Posen on 16 March 1860, Sidonie Werner was brought up in a well-to-do Jewish merchant's family. She attended a girls' high school before completing a course in teacher training. After first working in a Jewish school in the Hamburg suburb of Altona, she was employed by the Hamburg school authority until her retirement.

In 1893, together with Gustav Tuch, she founded the Israelitisch-Humanitären Frauenverein (Israelite Humanitarian Women's Association) which she chaired from 1908 until her death, supporting activities for children and women. In parallel, she was a strong proponent of women's rights, supporting professional qualifications for women and encouraging them to participate in commercial and political activities. In 1904, together with Bertha Pappenheim, she founded the German League of Jewish Women where she campaigned for women's suffrage and fought against the trafficking of girls. She represented the organization both in Germany and abroad.

In 1923, at the First World Congress of Jewish Women in Vienna, she gave a detailed presentation of the development of organizations for Jewish women in Germany, describing their activities in regard to support for women and children. She explained that there were some 230 women's organizations attached to the League of Jewish Women, with a total membership of 45,000. On 4 June 1929, as chair of the Hamburg Women's Association (Hamburger Frauenverein), Werner opened the Second World Congress of Jewish Women which was held in Hamburg.

Werner established a considerable number of facilities for Jewish women and children over the years. These included a girls' home in Hamburg (1906), a children's home in Bad Segeberg (1908), a children's home in Altona (1910), as well as several buildings in Bad Segeberg's Bismarckallee for children and mother care. In the late 1920s, she established a home for sick children in Wyk (1927), extending the facility in 1929. It was destroyed by fire in 1938.

On the political front, representing the German Democratic Party, she was a candidate for the city elections in 1919 but was not elected.

Sidonie Werner died in Bad Segeberg on 27 December 1932.

== Tribute ==
On March 16, 2021, Google celebrated her 161st birthday with a Google Doodle.
