= Wyk auf Föhr =

Wyk auf Föhr a Wik / Vyk
- Town
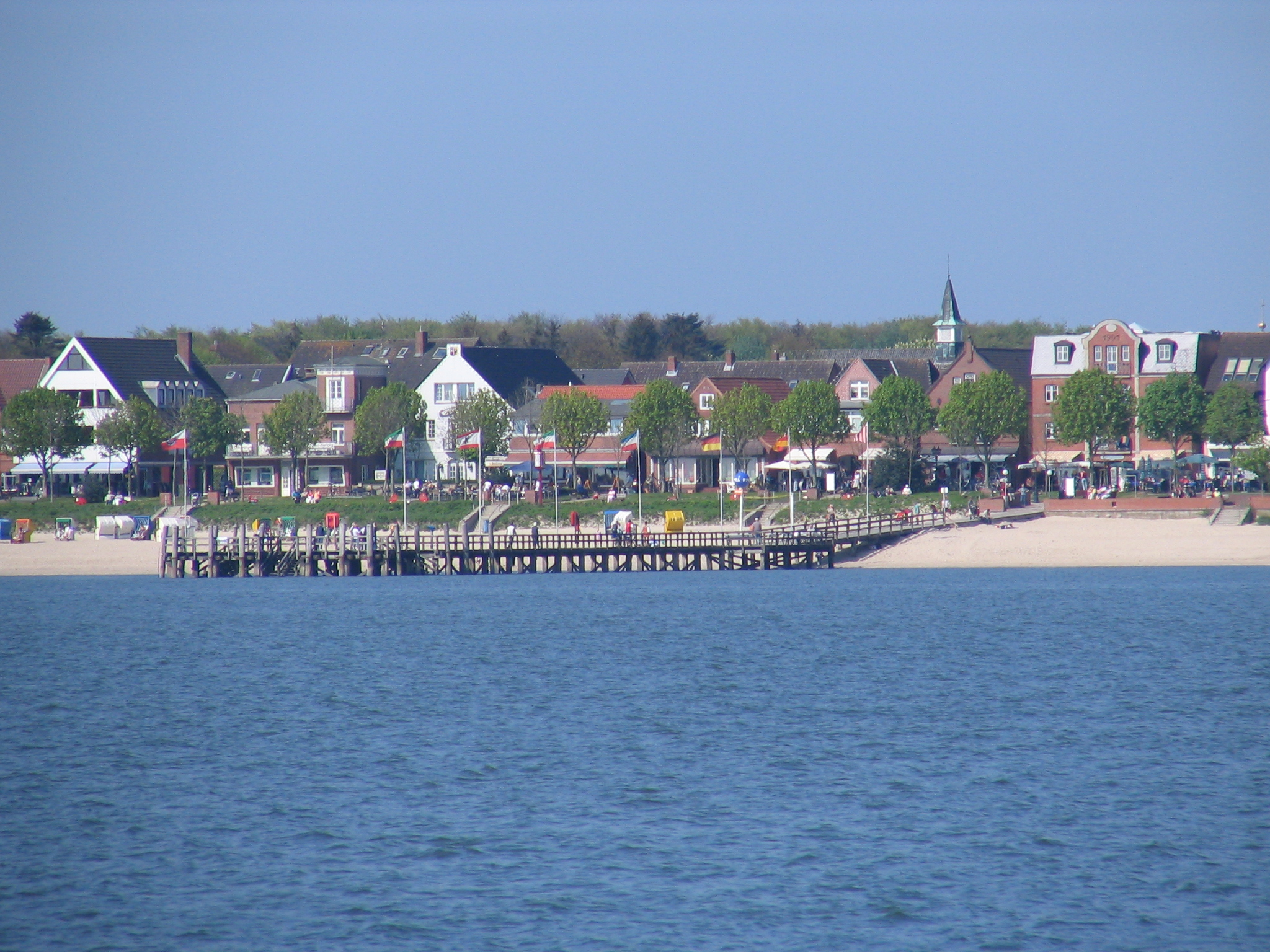
- Wyk's beach promenade as seen from the water

- Flag Coat of arms

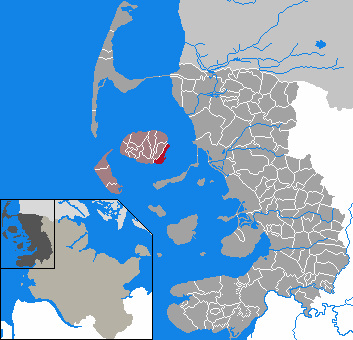
- Location of Wyk auf Föhr a Wik / Vyk within Nordfriesland district
- Interactive map of Wyk auf Föhr a Wik / Vyk
- Location within Germany Location within Schleswig-Holstein
- Coordinates: 54°42′N 8°34′E
- Country: Germany
- State: Schleswig-Holstein
- District: Nordfriesland
- Municipal assoc.: Föhr-Amrum

Government
  - Mayor: Hans-Ulrich Hess (CDU)

Area
  - Total: 8.08 km^{2} (3.12 sq mi)
- Elevation: 1 m (3.3 ft)

Population (2025-12-31)
  - Total: 4,109
  - Density: 509/km^{2} (1,320/sq mi)
- Time zone: UTC+01:00 (CET)
  - Summer (DST): UTC+02:00 (CEST)
- Postal codes: 25938
- Dialling codes: 04681
- Vehicle registration: NF
- Website: www.wyk.de

Wyk auf Föhr (German pronunciation: [ˈviːk ʔaʊf ˈføːɐ̯], lit. 'Wyk on Föhr'; North Frisian: Wik, a Wik; Low German: De Wyk, De Wiek; Danish: Vyk, Vyk på Før) is the only town on Föhr, the second largest of the North Frisian Islands on the German coast of the North Sea. Like the entire island it belongs to the district of Nordfriesland. Wyk includes the two minor town districts of Boldixum and Südstrand.

== Geography ==
Wyk is situated on the southeastern edge of the island. About 4,500 inhabitants live there, but during the tourist seasons 20,000 or more people will stay there. It serves as a regional centre for the islands of Föhr and Amrum, providing shopping centres, doctors, a post office, etc. and it is the seat of the Amt Föhr-Amrum and the social care centre for the islands. The approximately 4,200 other inhabitants of Föhr proper live in other villages on the island. Wyk's major source of income is the tourism business.

== History and tourism ==
Humans have been living in the area of Wyk since at least 14,000 years, as numerous mesolithic and neolithic tools and cremation urns from the iron age were found in the village of Boldixum.

Today’s Wyk originates from a settlement originally only consisting of the packing office of a merchant, first documented in 1601 as By der Wycke. By 1634, the settlement significantly grew as a result of a lot of people moving there after the Burchardi flood destroying many Halligen. 15 years later, 172 People already lived here, of whom many still witnessed the Erteilung der Fleckensgerechtigkeit (1706), which resulted in Wyk being legally recognized as a Flecken, which means a very small settlement. The newly founded municipality included the settlements of Rebbelstieg, Badestraße, Königsgarten and Sandwall. Hans Köllner, the first mayor, was elected in 1679. He held the office until 1711.

In 1704, Wyk was granted the rights of a seaport, and six years later, the rights of a market town were awarded. In 1819 a seaside spa was established, being the first of its kind in Schleswig-Holstein.

Thereby the state began to level up with the Baltic Sea region (Heiligendamm, 1794 and the East Frisian North Sea area (Norderney, 1794). In the first year, 61 guests were recorded, in 1820 there were 102, but only from 1840 on the numbers exceeded 200. From 1842 to 1847 the Danish king Christian VIII chose Wyk as his summer resort, which attracted numerous new tourists. In 1844 Hans Christian Andersen followed his king to Wyk and is known to have said about Wyk's beach: "I bathed every day and I must say it was the most remarkable water I have ever been in". But Andersen also criticized the problems of journeying there. For example, from Hamburg, on the road, a traveller needed four days to reach Föhr, by ship via Heligoland, it took two days only but included the danger of sickness.

To ensure that Christian VIII would also visit Wyk in the following years, the city planned to gift him a property for a royal palace to be built. The house previously standing on that property was destroyed and rebuilt on 20 Süderstraße, where it stands to this day. The plans for the royal palace where cancelled, when Christian died in 1848.

The town further grew and witnessed two mayor town fires. On 7 May 1857, a fire was caused during the construction of a new hotel. Wind caused the fire to spread into the center of Wyk and because of low rainfall, little to no firefighting water was available. 114 buildings were destroyed in total and a similar number of families became homeless. Another fire happened on the night from 7 to 8 July 1869.

Already before 1900, Wyk had electricity, a well established train and ship connection and health care and a growing amount of telephone connections.

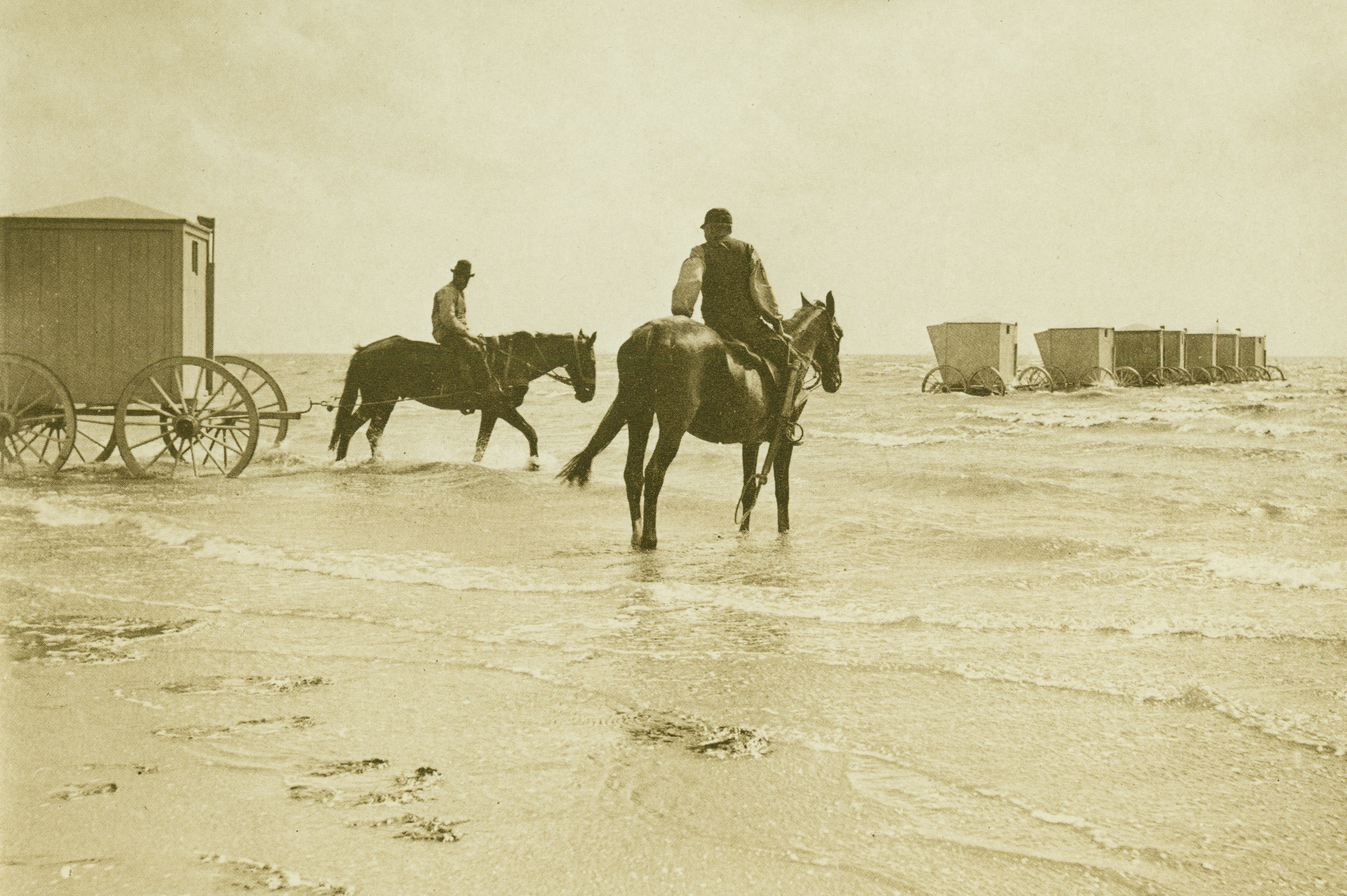
Bathing carts in Wyk around 1895.

Mayor Lorenz Petersen (b. 1848 - d. 1908) contributed to Wyk being officially granted full town rights in 1910. In 1919 the Women's suffrage was introduced in Germany, also bringing the first Woman into Wyk's city council. It took multiple decades until a second woman accomplished that. In 1924 the village of Boldixum was merged into Wyk, a decision facing backlash within Boldixum's citizens. In the same year, the Südstrand (translating to South beach) became a part of Wyk as well.

After World War II the first female principal of a school came to power. She was criticized for literally "Femininizing the educational system." Mayor Heinrich Henke Wyker organized the first local council election in September 1946. It was reported to be "difficult to accept the conflict as an inevitable expression of a free political life.” In 1947 Wyk applied for the honorary title Seeheilbad. The application was accepted in 1950.

== Politics ==
The local council has 17 members. Since the municipal elections of 2023, the distribution of seats in the town council is as follows:

- Kommunale Gemeinschaft (Local community): 5
- CDU: 4
- Green Party: 4
- SPD: 2
- FDP: 2

On 21 June 2023, the 17 council members re-elected Hans-Ulrich „Uli“ Hess of the CDU, mayor of Wyk for the second time. Hess was previously mayor of Meschede from 1999 to 2015.

The mayor and the members of the council work on an honorary basis.

=== Arms ===
Blazon: Gules. On a base azure, wavy, a shipwrecked 17th-century full-rigged ship or, without sails and with broken tops. In chief a mullet of six rays or.

Motto: Incertum quo fata ferunt. From Latin it translates roughly to 'It is uncertain where the fates carry [us]'. The motto refers to the dangers of shipping. Its importance for the town in earlier centuries was extraordinary. Both the flag and the Coat of arms are official since 1956.

=== Town twinning ===
- Mittenwald, Germany

== Media ==
Wyk is the seat of the editorial office of the daily paper Der Insel-Bote.

== Notable people ==
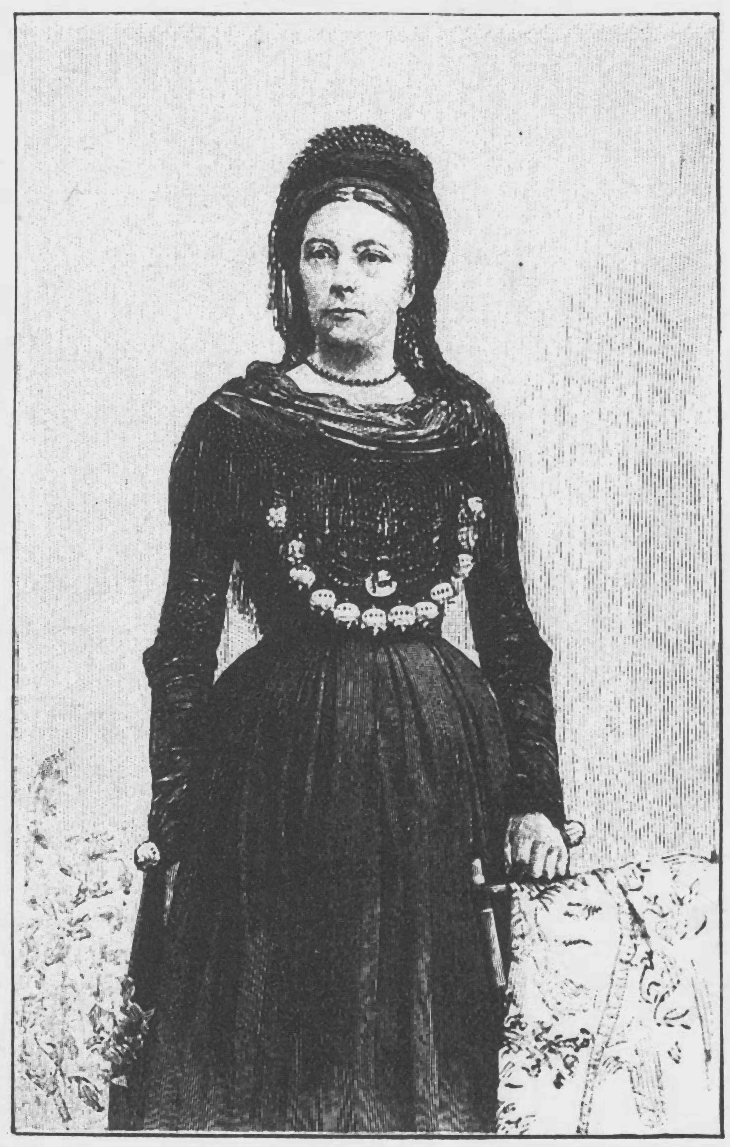
Stine Andresen ca. 1890

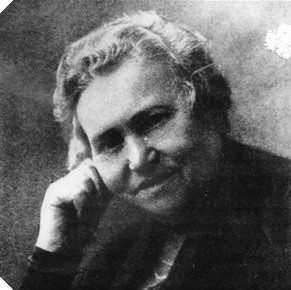
Sidonie Werner

=== Born in Wyk ===
- Hinrich Braren (1751–1826), a Danish sea captain
- Stine Andresen (1849–1927), poet
- Julius Stockfleth (1857–1935), a Denmark-born painter of landscapes and marine subjects.
- Sigurd Hammer (1862–1945), a Swedish Consul to Norway.
- Friedrich Christiansen (1879–1972), Luftwaffe General, Supreme Commander of the Wehrmacht in the Netherlands
- Knud Broder Knudsen (1912–2000), politician
- Hans von Storch (born 1949), climate researcher and meteorologist
- Arfst Wagner (born 1954), Waldorf school teacher and editor
- Olaf Jürgen Schmidt (born 1981), German author and theater director

=== Affiliated with Föhr ===
- Sidonie Werner (1860–1932), politician, founded a sanitorium in Wyk for Jewish children endangered by tuberculosis (1927–1938)
- Carl Haeberlin (1870–1954), founder of the Frisian museum in Wyk, researcher of Frisian history; pioneer of thalassotherapy
- Hellmuth von Mücke (1881–1957), officer of the Imperial Navy, lived in Wyk 1929–1940
- Hans-Jürgen von Maydell (1932–2010), silviculture scientist, graduated from high school in Wyk in 1954
- Lutz Stoklasa (born 1949), former Olympic swimmer, from 2021 a general practitioner in Wyk
- Heidrun Hesse (1951–2007), Professor of Philosophy, died in Wyk
- Stanfour (founded 2004), a rock band

=== Honorary citizens ===
- Ernst von Prittwitz und Gaffron (1833–1904), Prussian Lieutenant General and knight of the Order of St. John
