= Hugo Lubliner =

German writer (1846–1911)

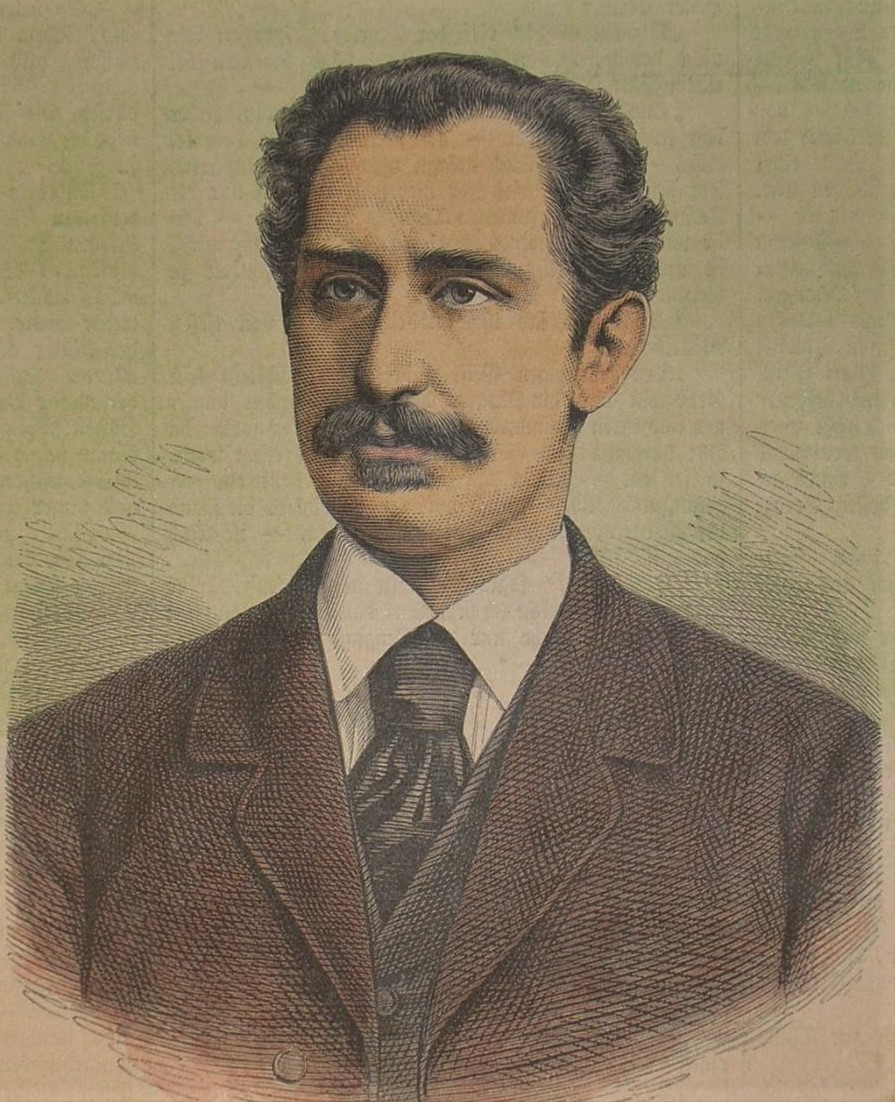
Hugo Lubliner (aka Hugo Bürger), 1879

Hugo Lubliner (1846-1911) was a German dramatist, whose pseudonym was Hugo Bürger, born in Breslau. His plays include:

- Der Frauenadvokat (1873), his first great success
- Die modelle des Sheridan (1875)
- Auf der Brautfahrt (1880)
- Mitbürger (1884)
- Die armen Reichen (1886)
- Der riegnitzer Bote (1891)
- Das neue Stück (1894)
- Der schuldige Teil (1900)
- Die lieben Feinde (1901)
- Der blau Montag (1902)
- Ein kritischer Tag (1904)
- Frau Schubels Tochter (1905)

He also wrote novels which are considered of small literary value.
