= List of canon lawyers =

This is a chronological list of canon lawyers. The listing is by date of death.

- Albert Avogadro (1149–1214)
- Bernardus Compostellanus Antiquus (13th century)
- Laurentius Hispanus (died 1248)
- Bartholomew of Brescia (died 1258)
- Henry of Segusio (Hostiensis) (c. 1200–1271)
- William Durandus, the Younger (died 1328)
- Astesanus de Ast (died c. 1330)
- Novella d'Andrea (died 1333)
- Bartholomew of San Concordio (c. 1260–1347)
- Giovanni d'Andrea (c. 1270–1348)
- John Acton (died 1350)
- Bonifazio Vitalini (c. 1320–after 1388)
- John Alen (1476–1534)
- Franz Burkard of Ingolstadt (died 1539)
- Antoine de Mouchy (1494–1574)
- Franz Burkard of Bonn (died 1584)
- Antonio Agustín y Albanell (1516–1586)
- Martín de Azpilcueta (1492–1586)
- Hendrik de Moy (+1610)
- Henry Swinburne (1551–1624)
- Agostinho Barbosa (1589–1649)
- Ludwig Engel (died 1694)
- Francesco Antonio Begnudelli-Basso (died 1713)
- Giovanni Clericato (1633–1717)
- Jean-Pierre Gibert (1660–1736)
- Vitus Pichler (1670–1736)
- Placidus Böcken (1690–1752)
- Carbo Sebastiano Berardi (1719–1768)
- Pietro Ballerini (1698–1769)
- Johann Caspar Barthel (1697–1771)
- Girolamo Ballerini (1701–1781)
- Maurus von Schenkl (1749–1816)
- Marie Dominique Bouix (1808–1870)
- Camillus Tarquini (1810–1874)
- Ferdinand Walter (1794–1879)
- Wilhelm Molitor (1819–1880)
- Friedrich Heinrich Vering (1833–1896)
- Felice Cavagnis (1841–1906)
- Pope Leo XIV (born 1955)
- Phil Ashey (born c. 1956)
