= Albert Order =

Order of merit in the Kingdom of Saxony

Albert Order Albrechts-Orden or Albrechtsorden
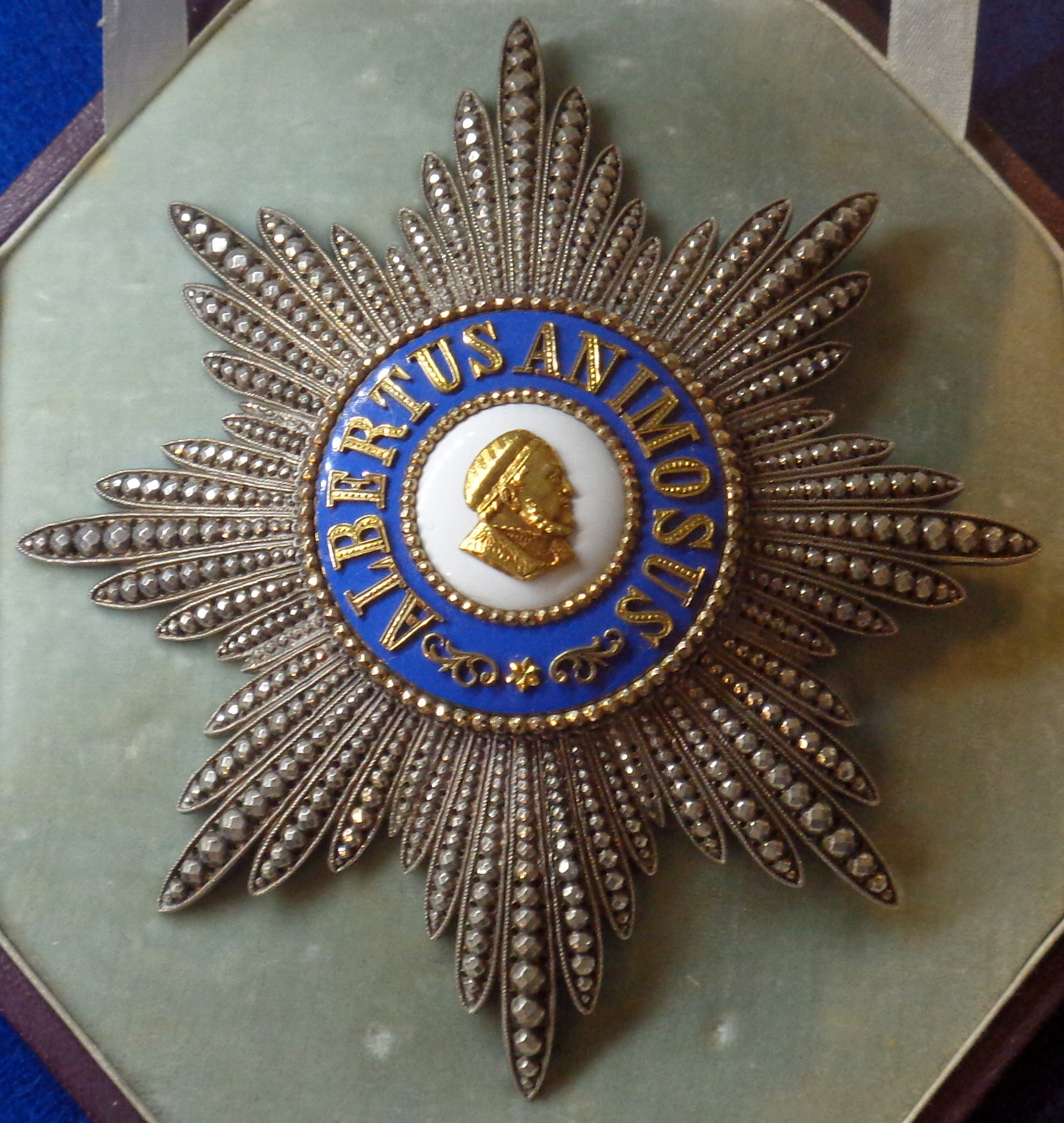
- Grand Cross Star of the order

Awarded by Kingdom of Saxony
- Type: Order of merit
- Established: 31 December 1850
- Eligibility: Saxon civilians and military officers
- Awarded for: service to the state for civil virtue, science, art and after 1860 the military
- Status: Obsolete
- Classes: Gold Grand Cross; Grand Cross; Commander's Cross 1st Class; Commander's Cross; Officer's Cross; Knight's Cross 1st Class; Knight's Cross 2nd Class; Honour Cross; Merit Cross with Swords

Precedence
- Next (higher): Military Order of St. Henry
- Next (lower): Civil Order of Saxony
- Ribbon of the order

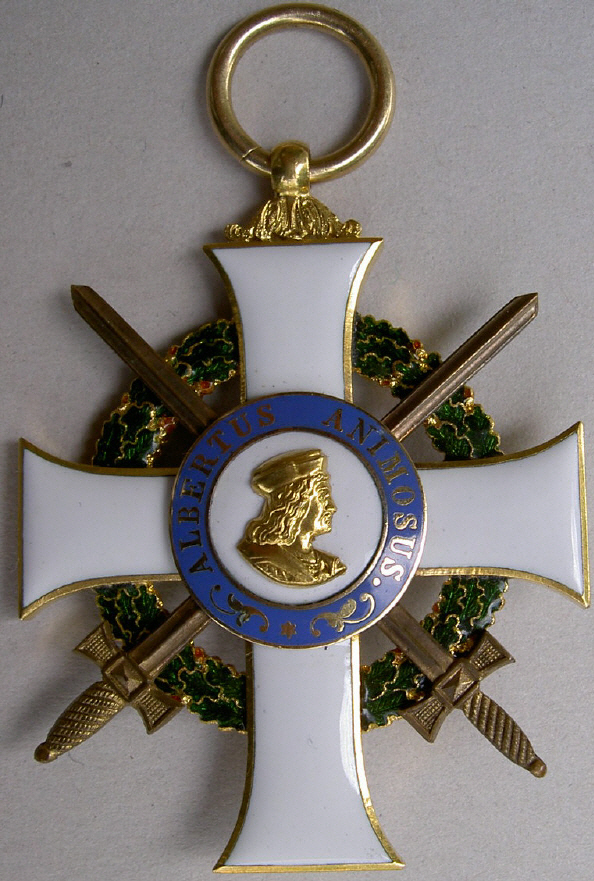
Badge of the order with swords

The Albert Order (German: Albrechts-Orden or Albrechtsorden) was created on 31 December 1850 by King Frederick Augustus II of Saxony to commemorate Albert III, Duke of Saxony (known as Albert the Bold). It was to be awarded to anyone who had served the state well, for civil virtue, science and art.

== Design ==
The design was a Christian cross with a bust of Albert the Bold at the centre. In 1875, however, it was discovered the bust was in fact the wrong Albert, Albert the Perennial, and the correct image was substituted and used thereafter.

== Grades ==
The grade structure of the Albert Order changed several times.

At first, there were five classes: Grand Cross (Großkreuz), Commander's Cross 1st Class (Komturkreuz I), Commander's Cross 2nd Class (Komturkreuz II), Knight's Cross (Ritterkreuz) and Small Cross (Kleinkreuz). These provided the basis for a series of changes over the following forty years. On 18 March 1858, the Small Cross was renamed as the Honour Cross (Ehrenkreuz) and a sixth class was established with a gold and silver Merit Medal (Verdienstmedaille). A Merit Cross (Verdienstkreuz) with Swords was added on 29 October 1866 and this was extended on 9 December 1870 with the Merit Cross with Swords on Ring.

The medals were abolished on 2 February 1876 and the Knights Cross was split into two classes. On 30 April 1884, a gold Great Cross was added and on 11 June 1890, the Officer's Cross was inserted into the Order between the Knight's Cross 1st Class and the Commander's Cross 2nd Class. So, at its abolition in 1918, the Order was structured thus:

Gold Grand Cross (Goldgroßkreuz)
Grand Cross (Großkreuz)
Commander's Cross 1st Class (Komturkreuz I. Klasse)
Commander's Cross (Komturkreuz II. Klasse)
Officer's Cross (Offizierskreuz)
Knight's Cross 1st Class (Ritterkreuz I. Klasse)
Knight's Cross 2nd Class (Ritterkreuz II. Klasse)
Honour Cross (Ehrenkreuz)
Merit Cross (Verdienstkreuz) with Swords

An award of Swords indicated a recipient's bravery in wartime. If, however, a recipient was subsequently awarded a higher grade in the Order, he could lose the bravery distinction attached to the superseded grade (regulations only allowed the display of the insignia of the highest awarded grade). This anomaly was solved in 1906 by allowing the addition of Swords by replacement of insignia. A recipient, however, had to pay the cost of replacement and this appears to have inhibited the numbers of such replacements.

== Recipients ==
- Gold Grand Crosses
  - Svasti Sobhana
- Grand Crosses
  - Abbas II of Egypt
  - Albert of Saxony
  - Alexander, Margrave of Meissen
  - Alfred, 2nd Prince of Montenuovo
  - Princess Anna of Saxony (1903–1976)
  - Aoki Shūzō
  - Gustav Bachmann
  - Friedrich von Beck-Rzikowsky
  - Friedrich von Bernhardi
  - Theobald von Bethmann Hollweg
  - Hans Alexis von Biehler
  - Gaetano Bisleti
  - Herbert von Bismarck
  - Moritz von Bissing
  - Adolf von Bonin
  - Felix Graf von Bothmer
  - Rudolf von Brudermann
  - Bernhard von Bülow
  - Hans von Bülow
  - Eduard von Capelle
  - Rudolf von Delbrück
  - Karl Ludwig d'Elsa
  - Max von Fabeck
  - Eduard von Fransecky
  - George, King of Saxony
  - Friedrich von Georgi
  - Heinrich von Gossler
  - Gottlieb Graf von Haeseler
  - Max von Hausen
  - Samu Hazai
  - Prince Henry of Prussia (1862–1929)
  - Prince Konrad of Hohenlohe-Schillingsfürst
  - Dietrich von Hülsen-Haeseler
  - Oskar von Hutier
  - Friedrich von Ingenohl
  - John of Saxony
  - Hans von Kaltenborn-Stachau
  - Georg von Kameke
  - Hans von Kirchbach
  - Hugo von Kirchbach
  - Konstantin of Hohenlohe-Schillingsfürst
  - Ewald von Lochow
  - Joseph Maximilian von Maillinger
  - Maria Emanuel, Margrave of Meissen
  - Georg Alexander von Müller
  - Hans von Plessen
  - Antoni Wilhelm Radziwiłł
  - Wilhelm von Ramming
  - Albrecht von Roon
  - Prince Rudolf of Liechtenstein
  - Reinhard Scheer
  - Alfred von Schlieffen
  - Ehrhard Schmidt
  - Ludwig von Schröder
  - Gustav von Senden-Bibran
  - Rudolf Stöger-Steiner von Steinstätten
  - Ludwig Freiherr von und zu der Tann-Rathsamhausen
  - Alfred von Tirpitz
  - Wilhelm von Tümpling
  - Julius von Verdy du Vernois
  - Victor II, Duke of Ratibor
  - Alfred von Waldersee
  - Wilhelm Karl, Duke of Urach
  - Ferdinand von Zeppelin
- Commander's Cross 1st Class
  - Friedrich Boedicker
  - Paul Puhallo von Brlog
  - Adolf von Deines
  - Friedrich Albrecht Erlenmeyer
  - Georg, Crown Prince of Saxony
  - Franz von Hipper
  - Maximilian von Laffert
  - Matsukata Masayoshi
  - Otto von Moser
  - Karl von Plettenberg
  - Wilhelm Souchon
  - Constantin von Tischendorf
  - Arthur Zimmermann
- Commander's Cross 2nd Class
  - Frane Bulic
  - Karl von Bülow
  - Leo von Caprivi
  - Friedrich August Eckstein
  - August Leskien
  - Karl Max, Prince Lichnowsky
  - Christian Otto Mohr
  - Hubert von Rebeur-Paschwitz
  - Ludwig von Reuter
  - Emidio Taliani
  - Ferdinand Walter
  - Ernst Windisch
- Officer's Crosses
  - Martin Chales de Beaulieu
  - Paul von Bruns
  - Géza Fejérváry
  - Friedrich von Gerok (officer)
  - Hans Heinrich XV, Prince of Pless
  - Adolf Wild von Hohenborn
  - Walther Reinhardt
  - Eberhard Graf von Schmettow
  - Walther Schroth
  - Otto von Stülpnagel
- Knight's Crosses 1st Class
  - Kurt Agricola
  - Joachim von Amsberg (general)
  - Ludwig Beck
  - Werner von Blomberg
  - Eduard Brockhaus
  - Fritz von Brodowski
  - Adolf von Brudermann
  - Kurt Eberhard
  - Waldemar Erfurth
  - Heinrich Ernemann
  - Friedrich Fahnert
  - Andreas von Fail-Griessler
  - Victor Franke
  - Hermann Geyer
  - Curt Haase
  - Kurt von Hammerstein-Equord
  - Christian Hansen (general)
  - Paul von Hase
  - Paul Hausser
  - Waldemar Henrici
  - Bruno Héroux
  - Wilhelm Heye
  - Ernst von Hoeppner
  - Hugo Richard Jüngst
  - Albrecht Kurzwelly
  - Paul Laux
  - Felix von Luckner
  - Oswald Lutz
  - Friedrich Olbricht
  - Johann Pflugbeil
  - Friedrich Wilhelm Ritschl
  - Gustav Schreck
  - Ernst von Schuch
  - Johann Gottfried Stallbaum
  - Hans Stohwasser
  - Hans von Tettau
  - Walter von Unruh
  - Heinrich von Vietinghoff
  - Hubert Weise
  - Walther Wever (general)
- Knight's Crosses 2nd Class
  - Frane Bulic
  - Karl von Bülow
  - Leo von Caprivi
  - Friedrich August Eckstein
  - August Leskien
  - Karl Max, Prince Lichnowsky
  - Christian Otto Mohr
  - Oskar Potiorek
  - Hubert von Rebeur-Paschwitz
  - Ludwig von Reuter
  - Emidio Taliani
  - Ferdinand Walter
- Honour Crosses
- Merit Crosses
- Unclassified
  - Frederick Augustus III of Saxony
  - Otto Hahn
  - Otto Hersing
  - Heinrich Kirchweger
  - Julius Kühn
  - Arno von Lenski
  - Georg Pittrich
  - Friedrich Sixt von Armin
  - Vladimir Sukhomlinov
  - Anton de Waal
