= Priest–penitent privilege in pre-Reformation England =

Type of privilege in historical England

The doctrine of priest–penitent privilege does not apply in England. However, before the Reformation, England was a Roman Catholic country and the Seal of the Confessional had great authority in the English courts.

== Anglo-Saxon England ==
In Anglo-Saxon England, there several laws concerning confession. The laws of Edward the Elder, son of Alfred the Great, enjoin:

And if a man guilty of death (i.e., who has incurred the penalty of death) desires confession let it never be denied him.

This injunction is repeated in the forty-fourth of the secular laws of King Canute. These laws are prefaced thus: "This then is the secular law which by the counsel of my witan I will that it be observed all over England".

The laws of King Ethelred the Unready declare (V, 22):

And let every Christian man do as is needful to him: let him strictly keep his Christianity and accustom himself frequently to shrift (i.e. confess): and fearlessly declare his sins.

The very close connexion between the religion of the Anglo-Saxons and their laws, many of which are purely ordinances of religious observance enacted by the state, the repeated recognition of the supreme jurisdiction of the Pope, and the various instances of the application in the Church in England of the laws of the Church in general lead to the opinion that the ecclesiastical law of the secrecy of confession was recognized by the law of the land in Anglo-Saxon England.

== After the Norman Conquest ==
In the period between the Norman Conquest and the Reformation the law of the Church in general, as to the inviolability of the seal of confession, is stringently enjoined by English councils. The Council of Durham (1220) declared as follows:

Ne sacerdos revelet confessionem-Nullus ira, vel odio, vel Ecclesiæ metu vel mortis in aliquo audeat revelare confessiones, signo vel verbo generali vel speciali ut dicendo 'Ego scio quales vos estis', sub periculo ordinis et beneficii, et si convictus fuerit, absque misericordia degradabitur, i.e. A priest shall not reveal a confession-let none dare from anger or hatred or fear of the Church or of death, in any way to reveal confessions, by sign or word, general or special, as (for instance), by saying 'I know what manner of men ye are' under peril of his Order and Benefice, and if he shall be convicted thereof he shall be degraded without mercy.

— Wilkins, Concilia, I, 577, 595

The Provincial Council of Oxford, held in 1222, contains a similar canon, in which degradation is prescribed for any breach of the seal. The law, as laid down by the 21st canon of the Lateran Council, is also declared in the Acts of the Synod of Exeter in 1287 (Spelman, Concilia, II, 357).

The fact that the laws of the Church were so emphatic on the subject, coupled with the fact that the Church was then the Church of the nation, affords good ground for inferring that the secular courts recognized the seal. The recognition of it would not have rested on any principle of immunity from disclosure of confidential communications made to clergymen. It would have rested on the fact that confession was a sacrament, on the fact of that necessity for it which the doctrine of the Church laid down, on the fact of the practice of it by both king and people, and on the fact that the practice was wholly a matter of spiritual discipline and one, moreover, in regard to which the Church had so definitely declared the law of absolute secrecy.

It is stated by some, among others by the Commissioners appointed to report upon the ecclesiastical courts in their report published in 1883, that the ecclesiastical courts in England did not regard themselves as bound by the rules of canon law framed by the Church outside England, by the various papal decrees, rescripts etc. But the Commissioners add that these courts paid great respect and attention to these rules, decrees etc. There seems to be so much weighty evidence against this view that it is difficult to accept it. Sir Frederick Pollock and Professor Frederic William Maitland in their joint History of English Law (I, 94 and 95) say that the jus commune or common law of the universal Church was the law of the Church in England. In this connexion important material is contained in the Provinciale of William Lyndwood (Oxford, 1679), arguably the only great English canonist.

== The Provinciale ==
The Provinciale consists of the provincial constitutions of fourteen Archbishops of Canterbury from Stephen Langton (d. 1228) to Henry Chichele (d. 1443). When Lyndwood was engaged on this compilation he was the principal official of the Archbishop of Canterbury. He had been, also, the prolocutor of the clergy in the Convocation of Canterbury.

Maitland, in his essays on Roman Canon Law in the Church of England, expresses the opinion that the ecclesiastical courts in England regarded the general body of canon law, including the various papal decrees and rescripts and the commentaries of the various great writers, as their law, which they had to administer. In citing Lyndwood as providing grounds for this opinion Maitland says: "At any rate he will state the law which he administers in the chief of all the English ecclesiastical courts".

In the Provinciale there is a constitution of "Walter, Archbishop of Canterbury", apparently Walter Reynolds, transferred from the See of Worcester in 1313. The constitution begins with a prohibition to priests who have fallen into mortal sin to say mass without first going to confession and warning them against imagining, as some believers erroneously do, that mortal sins are forgiven by the general confession made in the recitation of the Confiteor. It continues as follows:

Also let no priest dare from anger, hatred or fear, even of death, to disclose in any manner whatsoever, whether by sign, gesture or word, in general or in particular, anybody's confession. And if he shall be convicted of this he shall be deservedly, degraded, without hope of reconciliation.

== Lyndwood on confession ==
Lyndwood gives the following commentary on Walter Reynolds' constitution, occurring upon the word "Confession":

Supply 'Sacramental'. For in a Confession which is not sacramental, when, for instance, anyone in secret counsel reveals to some one else something which is not in the nature of sin, thus, suppose he reveals to a priest what he owes or what is owing to him, the priest is not to receive such a secret under the seal of Confession. And although through indiscretion he may have so received it, he is not to conceal it unless as a matter of counsel or secret. Wherefore, if the priest were ordered (compulsus) by a judge to tell the truth about such a debt, whenever a judge rightly inquires about the matter in order that he may know the truth, he is bound to do so, notwithstanding that he may have received the secret under the seal of Confession. And though he may have sworn to keep the matter secret, yet if afterwards that debt should be forfeited and the judge makes inquiry thereinto, if the priest is examined, he is bound to tell the truth, notwithstanding his sworn promise. For that oath is not binding on him, being an unlawful one and, thus, one not to be kept to the prejudice of another's right; [he cites in support, St. Thomas Aquinas and Hostiensis] but if some such debt is unjustly demanded by some tyrant, then though he is aware of the debt he ought to keep silence about it, or to change the subject or to reply sophistically [respondere sophistice]. [He cites in support a commentary on Raymond de Pennaforte]. But what if the priest should know that matter by any other means than by Confession before the spiritual tribunal [in foro animæ]? It may be said that in as far as he knows it by any other means and he is ordered [compulsus] by a judge he may tell it, but not, of course, so as he heard it in confession: but let him say, as follows: 'I heard it thus or I saw it thus'. But let him always refrain as far as possible from speaking about the person so as to avoid scandal unless there be immediate necessity. [He cites in support, Pope Innocent IV, the glossary on Raymond de Pennaforte and Astisanus, a Friar Minor and writer of the fourteenth century.]

Dealing with the priest's being found guilty of revealing a confession, he says:

But what if the person confessing consents to its being revealed, because, perchance, he calls the Confessor as a witness? The doctors say that he may reveal it. But understand this in such way that the priest shall on no account reveal that which he knows only through confession [hoc tamen sic intellige quod sacerdos illud, quod scit solum per confessionem, nullo modo debet revelare]. But the person who has confessed can intimate the matter to him in some other way which gives him leave to reveal it: and then he can tell, but, none the less, he ought to avoid scandal as much as possible. For he is bound to conceal the confession for two reasons, viz., on account of the sacrament, because it is almost of the essence of the sacrament to conceal the confession [quia quasi de essentia Sacramenti est celare Confessionem]: likewise for reason of the scandal. The first is removed by the permission of the person confessing, but the second remains none the less: and, therefore, where scandal is to be feared, he ought not to make use of such permission. These are the pronouncement of Thomas and of Peter, according to what is noted by John in Summa Confessionis Rubrica de Confessione celanda, quæstio, 100, and with this pronouncement Johannes Andræus seems to agree. But I ask: what if confession is made of some sin about to be committed, but not yet committed? For instance, some one confesses that he wants to kill a man or to commit some other misdeed and he says that he is unable to resist the temptation. May the priest reveal it? Some say that he may reveal it to such a person as can be beneficial and not detrimental [tali qui potest prodesse et non obesse], but the doctors of theology in this case say in general [communiter] that he must not reveal it, but must keep it entirely secret [omnino celare]. Henry de Segusio says, however, that whatever he can properly [bono modo] do for the prevention of the sin, he ought to do, but without mention of person and without betrayal of him who makes the confession. Others say that where the confession is one of a sin about to be committed it is not a real confession, and that to the person making it, a penance cannot be given [neo tali dari potest penitentia] and for these reasons it may be revealed to those who can be beneficial and not detrimental as I have said before. [He quotes Rudovicus and Guido of Baysio]

He states that Henry de Bohic:

... seems to adhere to the opinion of those theologians who say that even where future danger threatens, as, for instance, in the case of a heretic who proposes to corrupt the faith, or of a murder or of some other future temporal injury, the confessor ought to furnish a remedy [adhibere remedium] as far as he can without the revelation of the confession, as, for instance, by moving those confessing to desist and otherwise using diligence to prevent the purpose of the person confessing. He may, too, tell the prelate to look rather diligently [diligentius] after his flock: provided that he does not say anything through which by word or gesture he might betray the person confessing. And this opinion I hold to be more correct and more in keeping with the law, which speaks plainly. But the other opinion which sanctions the revelation of the confession to those who can be beneficial and not detrimental might hold good when the person confessing consents to it according to what I have said above.

Lyndwood then continues as follows:

One may deduce from the premises that if a judge maliciously presses and inquires of a priest whether he knows anything of such a fact, which he has, perhaps, heard in confession, if he cannot, by changing the subject or by some other means, turn aside the unjust judge, he can answer that he knows nothing thenceforth [inde], because it is secretly understood [subintelligitur] 'as man': or he can say simply 'I know nothing through confession' because it is secretly understood 'nothing to be revealed to you'.

Upon the word "generaliter" there is the following comment:

And so truly, not at all (i.e. the confession is not to be in any way revealed) when the confession has been made to the priest not as judge but as the minister of God. For if anything have been revealed to him as judge he is not bound to conceal it.

He cites Hostiensis in support. It is to be observed that there is nowhere an exception in respect of the crime of treason. His commentary on the duty of not disclosing the confession of a crime proposed to be committed tends to show that he would not have recognized any such exception.

== Pupilla oculi ==
A manual, called Pupilla oculi (see Gasquet, Pre-Reformation Essays), which appears to have been mainly designed for practical use among the clergy, was compiled towards the end of the fourteenth century by John de Burgh, a professor of theology and Chancellor of the University of Cambridge. According to Edward Badeley who wrote in 1865 a most able pamphlet on the privilege of the seal of confession entitled The Privilege of Religious Confessions in English Courts of Justice, this manual, to which Maitland also refers, enjoyed great popularity. Its counsels to confessors who may happen to be witnesses in a court of justice are sufficiently like those already cited from Lyndwood's Provinciale to render it unnecessary to quote them.

== Analysis from the Catholic Encyclopedia ==
The Catholic Encyclopedia provides the following analysis:

Lyndwood thus affords us, as Professor Maitland points out, even by the fact of citing these various authorities, very strong evidence that the general canon law was the law of the English ecclesiastical courts also. It may be remarked here that before the Reformation ecclesiastical canons were made by the authority of the synod with the sanction of the metropolitan. No crown sanction was required for their validity as canons. But the particular law in question was not one demanding observance in ecclesiastical courts merely, but in the civil and criminal courts of the land and on all occasions. It is an established principle of English law that no such rule or law could have become legally binding in England without being allowed and accepted there. The accuracy of the principle itself seems unquestionable and probably the only difference of opinion will arise as to the causes which might lead to the allowance and acceptance in England of rules of canon law. Adopting merely the basis that only such decrees and such rules of canon law as had been in fact received and accepted in England were binding there, we have evidence that the aforesaid Fourth Lateran Council, as to, at least, two of its decrees, viz., as to pluralities and as to clandestine marriages, was received and accepted in England. The judgments of the Courts in the case of Evans v. Ascuithe, tried in the third year of Charles I and reported in Palmer's "Reports", is based upon the validity of the former decree in England and it cites two cases, decided in the reign of Edward III, showing that the law declared by that decree had been acted upon by the civil courts of the land in that reign. The judgment of the Court of King's Bench delivered by Lord Hardwicke, in the case of Middleton v. Croft [(1736) cases temp. Ld. Hardwicke, 326], though not expressly saying that the second decree was accepted and allowed in England, by its reasoning shows us that such was the case.

The Catholic Encyclopedia goes on to quote Maitland on what it regards as "remarkable evidence of the acceptance of the decrees of the Council of Lateran in England". Speaking of trial by ordeal he says:

In 1215 the Lateran Council condemned the ordeal and at the beginning of Henry's reign the relation of England to Rome was such that this decree of the Church was at once, and of course, obeyed. As already said, the next eyre (i.e. Circuit of judges for trials in the various counties), and a very general eyre it was, took place in the winter of 1218-19. The judges had already started on their journeys when an order of the king in council was sent round to them. It was dated 26 January 1219, and is of such great moment in the history of our law, and, seemingly, so little known, that its substance shall be stated: "When you started on your eyre it was as yet undetermined what should be done with persons accused of crime, the Church having forbidden the ordeal."

— Maitland, Introduction to his edition of Pleas of the Crown for the County of Gloucester for the year 1221

The order, thereupon, proceeds to suggest certain rules for the judges to follow.

== Sources ==
- Ferme, B.E. [in German] (1996). Canon Law in Late Medieval England: A Study of William Lyndwood's 'Provinciale' with Particular Reference to Testamentary Law.
- Ogle, A. (2000). The Canon Law in Mediaeval England: An Examination of William Lyndwood's "Provinciale," in Reply to the Late Professor F. W. Maitland. Lawbook Exchange Ltd. ISBN 1-58477-026-0.

Attribution
