= Allegretto in C minor, D. 915 (Schubert) =

Short piano piece by Franz Schubert

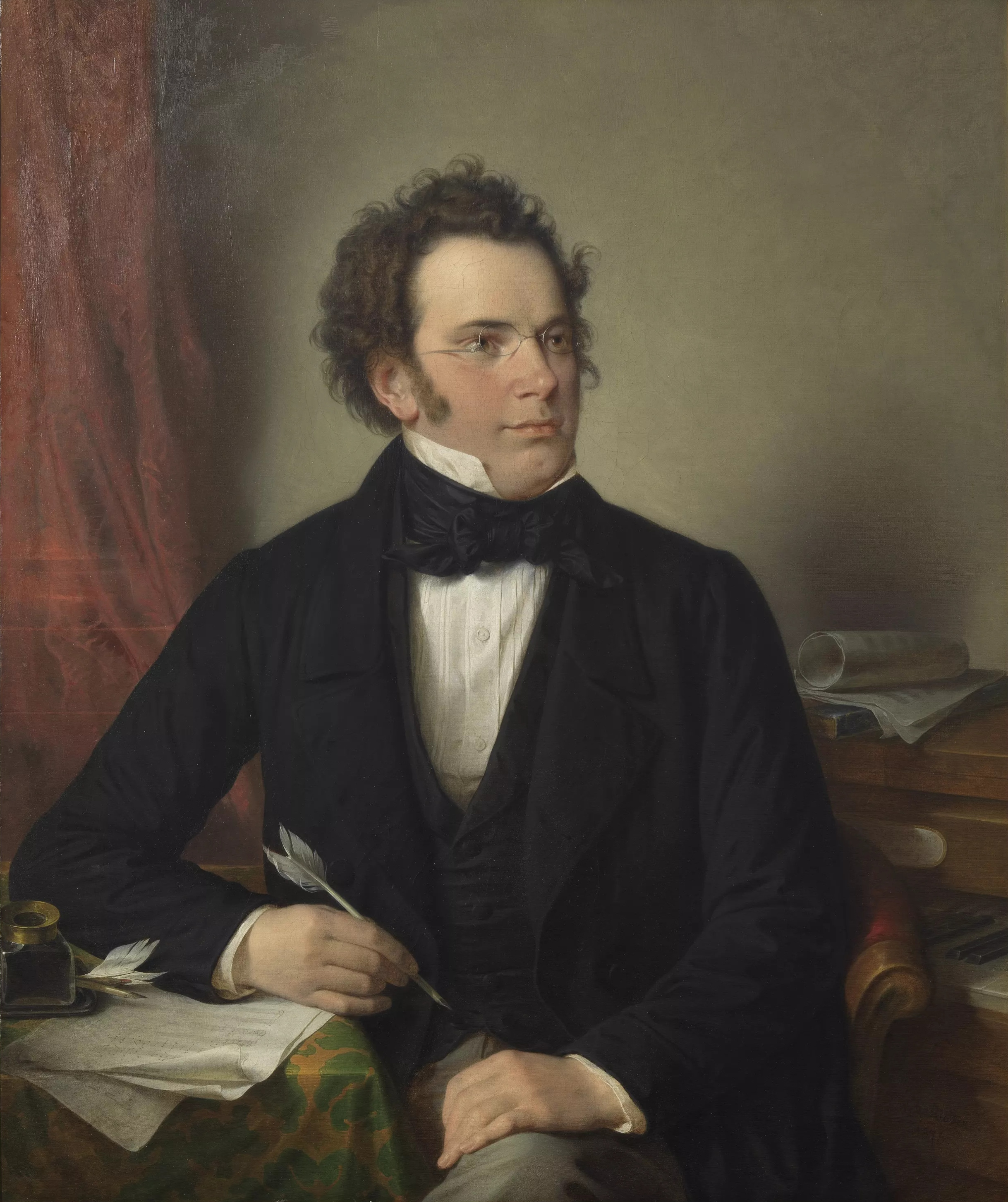
1875 portrait of Franz Schubert, after an 1825 original

Allegretto in C minor, D. 915 is a short piano piece written on 26 April 1827 by Franz Schubert. It is approximately 5 minutes in length.

== History ==
The immediate occasion for the composition was the departure of Schubert’s friend Ferdinand Walcher for a post in Venice; Schubert copied the piece into Walcher’s album at the latter’s farewell party. Nevertheless, Blair Johnson points out that it is "tempting" to read into the piece the momentous event that had occurred in Schubert’s life only a month earlier: the death of Beethoven on March 26. Schubert had met his great predecessor only once, but Beethoven, in bed with his final illness, praised the Schubert lieder he had seen and raved about them to all his visitors, most likely thereby singlehandedly raising Schubert’s musical reputation in Vienna. Schubert had been one of the torchbearers at Beethoven’s funeral. Johnson continues, "it may well be that Beethoven was in Schubert’s thoughts when he sat down to pen the Allegretto in C minor D 915." He goes on to suggest that even the key of C minor is significant, as this key was special to Beethoven. Suzanne Yanko echoes these sentiments: "The influence of Beethoven was evident in this composition."

== Structure ==
The piece has a simple A-B-A structure, in keys of C minor – A♭ major – C minor. Johnson call it a "perfectly balanced ternary piece" and continues: "the 6/8 meter arpeggiation of the main theme is the sort of thing that Beethoven might indeed have spun." David Truslove describes: "Momentum in the outer panels is twice interrupted by the arrival of two disquieting chords, while sighing gestures bring untroubled warmth to the movement’s chordal centerpiece in a glowing A flat major." Johnson describes the middle section as "sounding something like a broken up chorale"; he finds that this "rich pianissimo" middle section seems to anticipate the music of Schumann and Brahms, both of whom thought highly of Schubert.
