= Vitalini =

Vitalini is a surname. Notable people with the surname include:

- Bonifazio Vitalini (c. 1320–after 1388), Italian jurist
- Francesco Vitalini (1865–1904), Italian painter and engraver
- Pietro Vitalini (born 1967), Italian alpine skier
