= Kurt Agricola =

World War II general

- Born: 15 August 1889; Döbeln, Amtshauptmannschaft Döbeln, Kreishauptmannschaft Leipzig, Kingdom of Saxony, German Empire
- Died: 27 December 1955 (aged 66); Bad Godesberg, North Rhine-Westphalia, West Germany
- Relatives: ∞ 1922 Martha Edith Anna Sara Hahn (1898–1981)
- Military career
- Allegiance: Kingdom of Saxony; German Empire; Weimar Republic; Nazi Germany
- Branch: Royal Saxon Army; Imperial German Army; Reichsheer; German Army
- Service years: 1908–1945
- Rank: Generalleutnant
- Commands: Korück 580
- Conflicts: World War I: First Battle of the Marne; Battle of the Somme; World War II: German occupation of the Soviet Union; Prague offensive (POW)
- Awards: Knight's Cross of the Military Order of St. Henry; German Cross in Gold
- Other work: Author (Note: Kurt Agricola is not to be confused with Alexander Bauermeister (born 11 March 1889 in St. Petersburg), a German intelligence agent during World War I, who published a number of books under the pseudonym "Agricola" during the 1930s. See also Deutsches Literatur-Lexikon – das 20. Jahrhundert. Band 1: Aab–Bauer [Dictionary of German Literature – the 20th Century. Volume 1: Aab–Bauer] (in German). Berlin: De Gruyter. 2000. p. 87. ISBN 3-908255-01-5.)

Kurt Wilhelm Albert Karl Agricola (15 August 1889 – 27 December 1955) was a general in the Wehrmacht of Nazi Germany during World War II who held senior level occupational rear-security commands in the occupied Soviet Union. A native of Saxony, Agricola entered army service in 1908 and served during World War I. During the interwar era, he held staff assignments and continued to rise through the army's ranks in the Wehrmacht of the German Reich. His career stalled in January 1939, when he was sent into retirement on political grounds because of his marriage to Martha born Hahn, a Jewish woman. Reactivated again upon the start of World War II, Agricola received exclusively positions behind the front line. As rear area commander of the 2nd Army in the occupied Soviet union during 1941–43, Agricola brought changes in the Wehrmacht's harsh occupation policies and was successful in maintaining control of his area of occupied territory from Soviet partisans. Shortly after the war's end, he was arrested by Soviet authorities, convicted of war crimes and remained in captivity for a decade. One of the last German prisoners in the Soviet Union, he was released in October 1955 and died shortly thereafter in West Germany.

== Early life and World War I ==
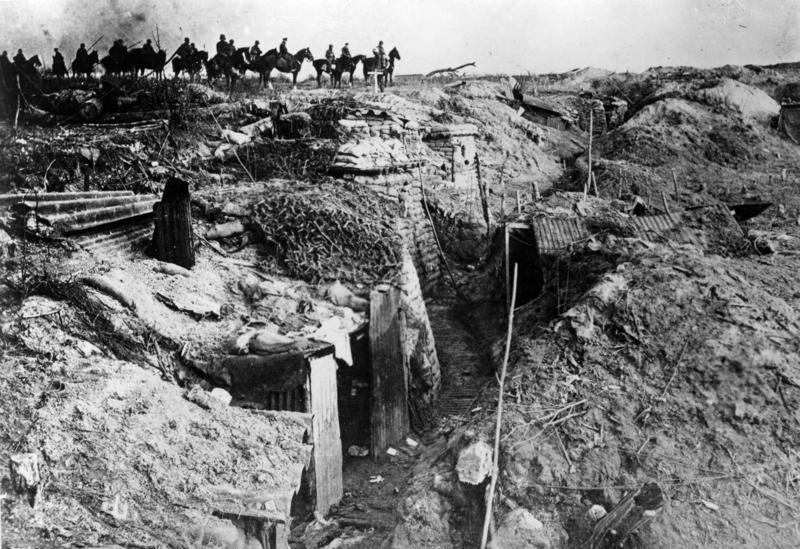
The staff of a German division inspects a captured English position on the Western Front (1918)

Kurt Agricola was born in Döbeln, then in the Kingdom of Saxony, on 15 August 1889, into a Saxon family that traced its roots back in the 16th century. He was the second and youngest son of Lieutenant Colonel Rudolf Ernst Bernard Agricola (3 October 1860 – 29 July 1914), an officer of the Royal Saxon Army with the Garrison Administration of Dresden, and Elisabeth Emilie Anna, née von Drenkmann (14 May 1865 – 23 October 1937), daughter of the President of the Prussian Court of Appeal and Crown Syndic, Edwin Waldemar Balduin Friedrich von Drenkmann (1826–1904). He had an older brother, Werner Agricola (19 August 1887 – 29 June 1962).

Following his father's career, 18-year–old Agricola entered army service on 1 April 1908 as officer candidate in the 12th Royal Saxon Infantry Regiment No. 177 in Dresden. He was commissioned a Leutnant (Second Lieutenant) on 19 August 1909. The following years, he served primarily as adjutant, a function that was given to capable officers and gave an early advancement potential within the army. It was obvious that Agricola pursued a distinguished career as staff officer, and (typically for officers with his aims, who participated in specialized courses) attended a weapon repairs course in late 1913.

When World War I broke out, Agricola was mobilized along with his regiment, just a few days after the death of his father. Agricola served mostly at the Western front, and although he never received a troop command throughout the war (only staff assignments), this indicated that he was destined for a more ambitious career than most of his fellow troop officers; he became Adjutant of a battalion in his regiment on 2 August 1914, participated in the battle of the Marne in September and was promoted to Oberleutnant (First Lieutenant) in December. In early January 1915 he served as the regimental Adjutant of his pre–war regiment until August 1916, when he was temporarily elevated to Brigade Adjutant. In that capacity, he saw action at the Battle of the Somme, where he distinguished himself numerous times. On 9 January 1917 he was transferred to the staff of the 219th (10th Royal Saxon) Infantry Division, occupying a relatively quiet sector of the front line in Lorraine. A few weeks later, on 27 January, he was promoted to Hauptmann (Captain) and four days later, the last King of Saxony, Frederick Augustus III, bestowed him with one of Saxony's highest decorations, the Military Order of St. Henry, in recognition of his conduct during the battle of Somme the previous year. He received his last wartime assignment on 25 May 1917, when he was transferred to the staff of the XII (1st Royal Saxon) Corps.

Becoming a staff officer — a group considered the élite of the German Army — required a three–year course at the War Academy in Berlin after some years of active service. Agricola's ambition to become a staff officer, however, was thwarted by the war, as the War Academy closed upon its outbreak. Apart from his relevant staff appointments, he had the chance to participate in a special staff officers course from January to February 1918. During the course of war, he was decorated with numerous awards, including both classes of the Iron Cross and other awards from his native Saxony.

== Interwar period ==
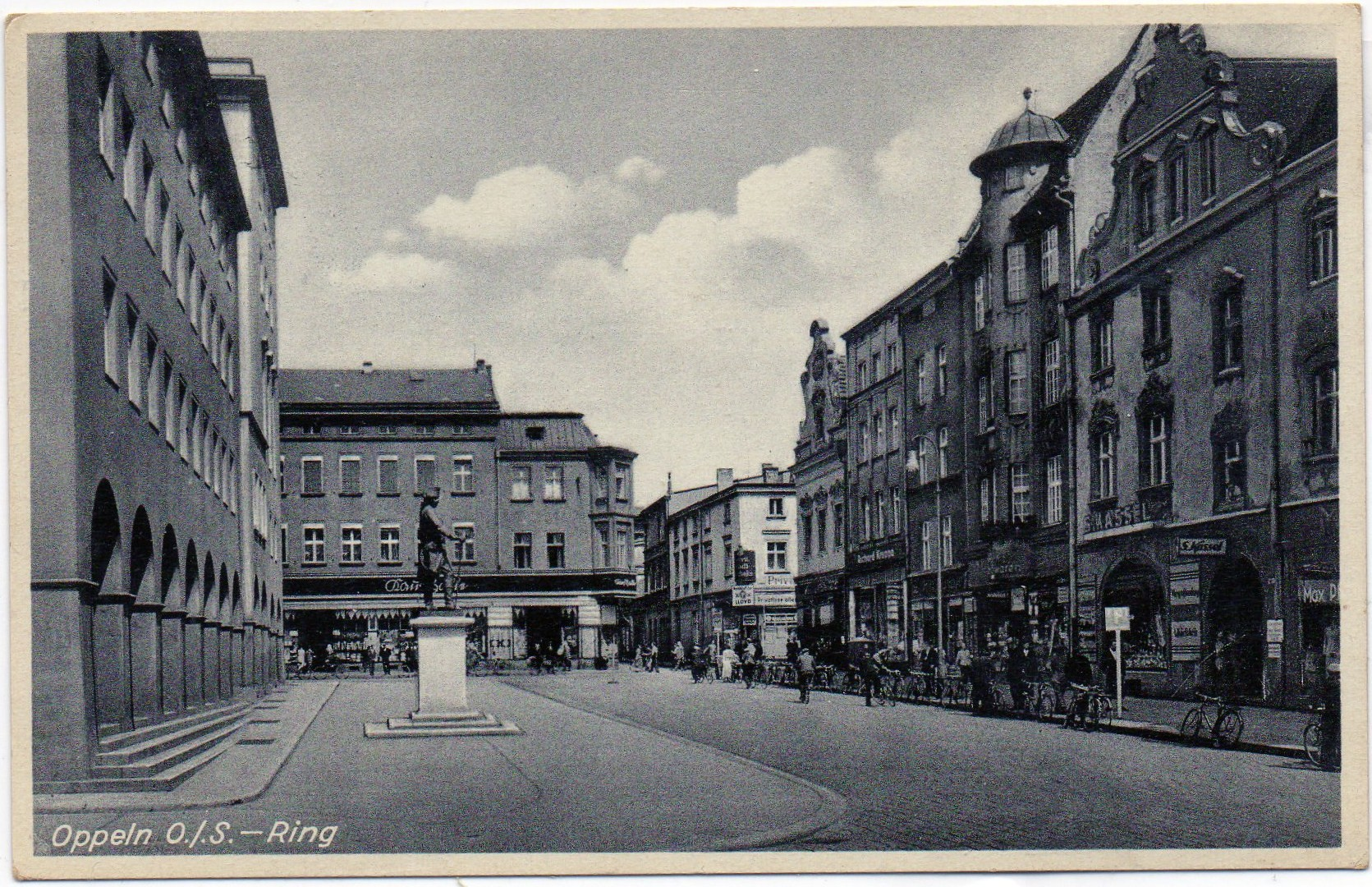
The city of Oppeln at the time when Agricola was commander of its Landwehr and fortifications (1938)

Following the end of World War I in November 1918, Agricola was retained in the Reichswehr holding a variety of staff roles. He was promoted to major in 1928. From 1927 to 1930, he commanded a company of the 10th Infantry Regiment. In February 1930 he returned to the staff of Gruppenkommando 1 and in 1931 to that of the 4th Division, where, as an Oberstleutnant (Lieutenant Colonel) from 1932, he saw the rise of the Nazi regime in 1933. Soon thereafter, in July 1934, he received his promotion to Oberst (Colonel), and after a two-month transfer in the Command of the Wehrkreis (Military District) IV (Dresden) he was named commander of the Infantry Regiment Breslau in 1934 and retained his command after it was redesignated as the 49th Infantry Regiment on 15 October 1935.

Arguably, Agricola could hope, at the time, that he would have a successful career in the ongoing re–organization of the new armed forces of Germany — the Wehrmacht. Besides his tenure of multiple staff positions, Agricola also received very positive reports from his superiors; he was praised as "very talented", and described as an "especially reliable staff officer", "an excellent regimental commander", while it was noted in most of his assignments that he performed brilliantly at his position. Nonetheless, his hopeful career soon started to fade away. On 12 October 1937, he was named commander of Heeresdienststelle 3, a rather obscure unit tasked with guarding the eastern borders of the Third Reich; during this time, his superiors observed that "sometimes he underestimated his great concern for the troops", an indication of his caring leadership style. On 1 January 1938 he was promoted to Generalmajor (Major General), but no higher commands awaited him: on 10 October 1938 he was named Landwehr Commander in Oppeln (present-day Opole in Poland) and simultaneously given the command over the fortifications of the city. In his function as Landwehr commander, he had attend to the organization and the training of older reservists (35–45 years of age), some of them veterans of World War I. This was a backwater post for an officer such as Agricola, whose once–promising career came finally to an abrupt end on 31 January 1939, when he, 49 years old at the time, retired from the army and was simultaneously given the honorary rank (Charakter) of a Generalleutnant (Lieutenant General).

The reason for Agricola's retirement was never officially disclosed and remained a puzzling question, until his chief of staff testified in 1967 that the ground was that Agricola's wife was Jewish. For a staunchly antisemitic regime such as the Nazi one, and with the implementation of racial laws, marriage with a Jewish woman could be a threat to an officer's career as well as life. His personal papers indirectly reveal that Agricola had been put on watchlist for racial reasons. Soon, his own ancestry came under official, if indirect, investigation. Initially, Agricola was asked to prove (and was able to do so) his "Aryan" ancestry (up until his great–grandfathers) in 1937. As the effect of the Nazi racial policies became more dangerous to the life of his wife and the couple's children — naturally classified as Mischlinge — Agricola was forced to divorce his wife Martha, who afterwards fled with her son Wilhelm to Brazil. Agricola also sent their other children to the Bethel Institution in Bielefeld for their own protection.

In 1939, Agricola also published the book Der rote Marschall. Tuchatschewskis Aufstieg und Fall (The Red Marshal. Tukhachevsky's Rise and Fall), an account of the career of Marshal of the Soviet Union Mikhail Tukhachevsky, who was executed during Joseph Stalin's Great Purge in 1937. This publication revealed, among others, that Agricola was a convinced Anti-bolshevist.

== World War II ==
Agricola's retirement was short-lived, as on 1 September 1939 Nazi Germany invaded Poland, marking the start of World War II in Europe, and Agricola was reactivated and appointed as commander of the city of Oppeln. There he spent the following two years on an inactive front, witnessing the Invasion of the Soviet Union on 22 June 1941.

=== Rear security operations in the Soviet Union (1941–1943) ===
"Now the population is greatly affected by our need to exploit the land for our purposes. The food rations issued to the population are lower than those that the Soviets provided. From this point of view, we can expect neither a positive nor a moderate opinion about us [the German troops]. A decision the Russians in the occupied territories would expect from us, would clarify the situation and allow us to do a systematic work."

— Kurt Agricola, Situation Report No. 2 of the Korück 580 (4 February 1942)

With the Battle of Moscow and the Soviet counter-offensive of the winter of 1941/42, the rear security of the occupied territory was considered by the German High Command of paramount importance, given how stretched the Wehrmacht's supply lines were. The resistance movement and the Soviet partisans, reinforced by Red Army soldiers who had evaded capture when their units were destroyed during the initial stages of the invasion, posed the most essential threat to the control of the areas behind the front. The main formations tasked with the protection of the supply lines and the destruction of the partisans were the Korück (acronym for Kommandant rückwärtiges Armeegebiet, Commander of the Rear Area Army Territory).

Agricola was appointed Korück 580, in the rear area of the 2nd Army, with headquarters in Kromy on 19 December 1941, with the battle for Moscow in full swing, succeeding the 64-year old Generalleutnant Ludwig Müller (who had requested his relief because of a heart ailment). Besides holding a command that lacked probability of advancement or distinction — being far behind the front — Agricola had to deal with immense problems as soon as he took over the appointment. Korück 580 was the sole formation responsible for the protection of approximately 37,000 km^{2} of occupied territory, 800 km of railway (including the vital Kursk–Oryol line), 500 km of roads and 320 bridges. The forces at the Korück's disposal were insufficient for such a task, merely 800 men of questionable fighting value who had to operate in difficult winter conditions. Opposing Agricola's forces were 2,000 to 2,500 armed partisans.

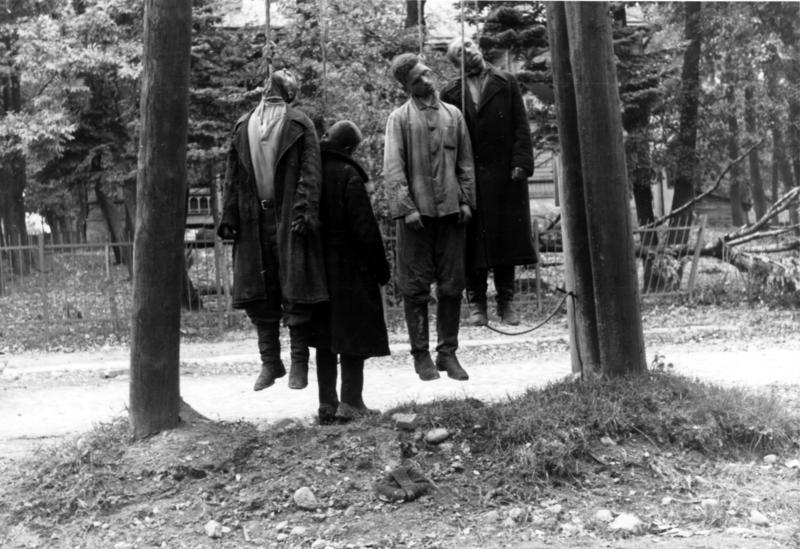
Men hanged as partisans somewhere in the Soviet Union. Such a sight was common in the areas under German occupation

Agricola, finally given a chance to prove himself as commander, addressed the problems energetically. He quickly came to the conclusion that major anti–partisan actions were impossible to conduct due to the extreme conditions and the lack of forces, so he opted to concentrate and fortify his available forces in key positions. It was due to his persistence that the 2nd Army yielded to his requests and reinforced him with over 10,000 Hungarian troops until May 1942. During these months, Agricola's units battled fiercely with partisans, succeeding in killing over 7,200, according to official reports. German historian Christian Hartmann argued that the relatively heavy casualties of the Korück's troops — 1161 dead, wounded and missing — and the number of captured enemy weapons indicated that Agricola, in contrast with the typical occupation policy of the time, was not focused (at least exclusively) in reprisals against the civilian population, in the hope of terrorizing and weakening the partisan movement. Korück 580 was ultimately successful in eliminating the local partisan threat until the summer of 1942. Agricola also supported the utilization of Soviet volunteers in anti–partisan warfare. In his area of responsibility, in May–June 1942, a battalion formed of Turkestani volunteers, the Turkestanisches Infanteriebataillon 450 (Turkestani Infantry Battalion 450) took part in operations. On 30 June 1942, Agricola praised the commander of the unit, Andreas Mayer–Mader, for his effective leadership style.

Noting the increasing influence Soviet propaganda had on the population, Agricola called for more humane treatment, so that the population would not be an impediment in the exploitation of the occupied territory for the war effort. For this, he restrained the indiscriminate executions of civilians, though the figures of those executed remained high: he reported that until June 1942, his units had executed 1,600 out of 6,000 civilians suspected of a wide range of punishable actions (the Kommissarbefehl was also implemented) and released unharmed most of the remaining 4,400. Mass starvation, primarily due to the reckless exploitation of resources by the Wehrmacht was common in other occupied Soviet territories, and the situation in the Korück's territories was not very different. In February 1942, Agricola wrote that the food rations for the civilians were lower than those issued by the pre–war Soviet regime and felt that given the situation, it would be impossible to cultivate positive feelings towards the German troops, thus calling for a change.

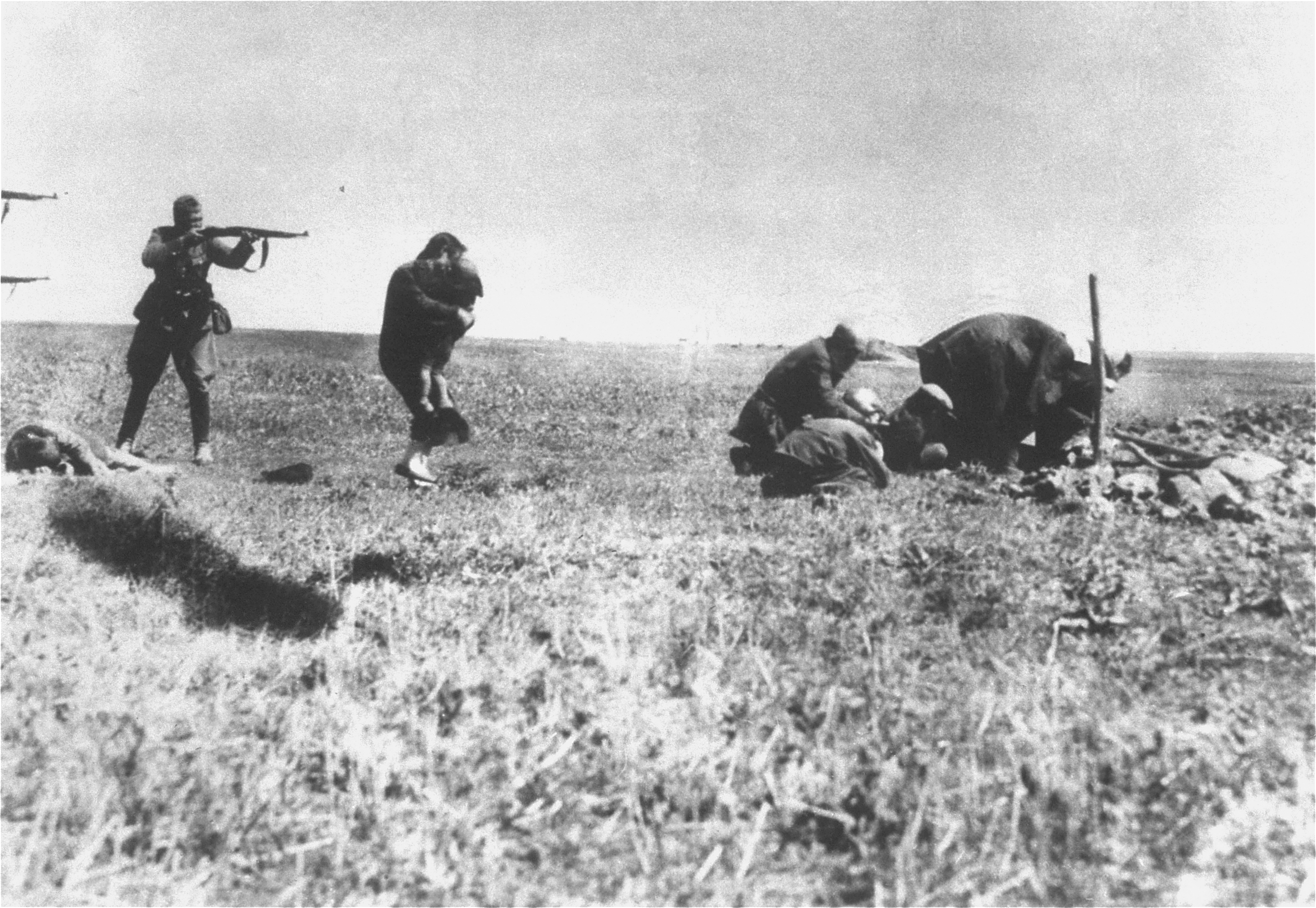
Einsatzgruppen troops killing Jewish civilians in Ukraine. Agricola reportedly opposed and was "outraged" at the executions of Jews in areas under his jurisdiction

Among his first acts of assuming the position of the Korück was to revoke the order of the 2nd Army for the immediate liquidation of POWs by the SS, after the dissolution of four POW camps in the area, despite that ultimately their execution was not averted. Agricola considered the improvement of the conditions in the POW camps vital for "economic, simply humanitarian and propagandistic reasons", an extremely rare declaration for a rear area commander. After he was informed of the appalling conditions and the high mortality rates in the POW camps in January 1942, he issued orders prohibiting the maltreatment of prisoners, as well as the reduction of food rations, and sought the establishment of a minimum of medical care, ostensibly for the protection of his own troops from typhus.

In addition, the troops of the Korück 580 were confronted with the Holocaust and the massive extermination of the Jews in its territory, though most Jews had been already exterminated a few months after Agricola's appointment as Korück. It has been speculated that Agricola, perhaps because his own wife was Jewish, distanced himself from the responsible units of the police and the SS. No written evidence exists to support that Agricola was actively trying to stop some of the killings, but his former chief of staff stated after the war that he did so, and furthermore that Agricola was "very outraged" at the massacres. On an instance, in 1943, upon learning that SD troops were murdering Jews near his headquarters, he intervened and prohibited further executions. He intervened numerous times to bring the subject to the attention of his superiors and made sure that no Jewish POW was handed over for execution.

In conclusion, Kurt Agricola was one of the very few commanders who tried to change the occupation policies that were the norm in Nazi–occupied territories and opted to minimize resistance by treating the population humanely instead of terrorizing it. According to historian Christian Hartmann, "it is difficult to say" if Agricola's stance stemmed from ethical values or from political necessity. Agricola's former chief of staff supported the former view, describing Agricola as a "very humane, highly educated and extraordinarily capable man". Agricola's actions ultimately found recognition by his superiors, reflected by his decoration with the German Cross in Gold on 15 December 1943, a highly unusual award for rear area commanders, as the German Cross in Gold was typically awarded to commanders at the front (rear area personnel could receive, by contrast, the German Cross in Silver).

=== Later career (1943–1945) ===
Agricola was finally promoted to Generalleutnant (Lieutenant General) z. V. (zur Verfügung, "for duties") (Note: The designation "z. V." was introduced in 1938. It was applied to officers who were retired or inactive within the army (e. g. an officer who was not retired but did not occupy a position) but were scheduled to take up active duties in case of mobilization.) on 1 August 1943 and also served briefly as commander of Kursk during that year. In 1944, he also commanded "Gruppe Aricola" (Group Agricola), a formation consisting of Korpsabteilung E and a cavalry brigade, which fought against the Red Army mainly in the central section of the eastern front. Agricola remained Korück 580 until 18 April 1945, whereupon he was placed in the Führerreserve.

== Captivity and later life ==
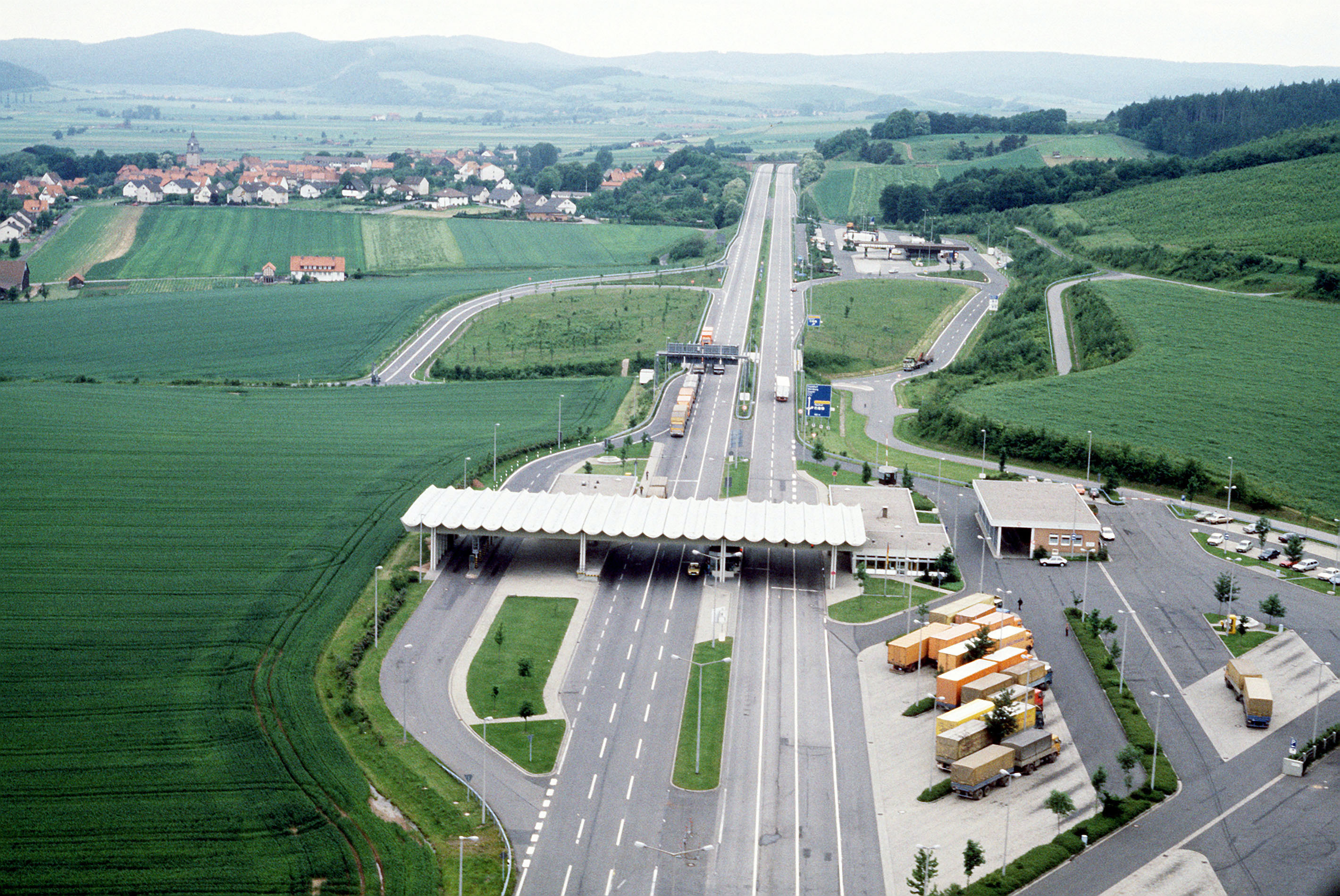
The border crossing above Herleshausen, where Agricola was released on 9 October 1955 (photograph from 12 June 1985)

On 9 May 1945, one day after the unconditional surrender of the Wehrmacht, General Agricola was captured by Soviet troops in Teplitz-Schönau in the Reichsgau Sudetenland (present-day Teplice in the Czech Republic), and was subsequently deported to the Soviet Union, where he was imprisoned in camps Nos. 27, 62, 362, 476, and 48. Afterwards, he was transported to Prison No. 1 in Kyiv to be tried for war crimes. A military tribunal of the Ukrainian Ministry of Internal Affairs in the Kiev Oblast found him guilty under Article 1 of Ukaz 43 (19 April 1943) and sentenced him to 25 years of hard labor on 16 November 1948. He served his sentence in the labor camps of Karaganda in Kazakhstan and Vorkuta in the Komi Republic. Later, he was held at the Voikovo prison camp near Ivanovo, which was designated by the Soviet authorities for high-ranking Wehrmacht personnel.

In early October 1955, following the negotiations between the West German and the Soviet governments, Agricola was repatriated to the German Democratic Republic along with 31 fellow officers (mostly generals, including Dietrich von Saucken). On 9 October 1955, the transport reached the West German town of Herleshausen, a few kilometers west of the borders with East Germany.

After his repatriation, Agricola was reunited with his family and remarried his former wife, who had in the meanwhile returned from Brazil where she had fled the Nazis in the late 1930s. On 27 December 1955, two months after he was released, Kurt Agricola died in Bad Godesberg near Bonn.

== Promotions ==
| Date | Rank (Note: The symbols inside the parentheses denote the seniority of the rank.) | Corresponding rank in English |
| 1 April 1908 | Fahnenjunker | Officer Candidate |
| 28 November 1908 | Fähnrich | Officer Cadet |
| 19 August 1909 | Leutnant with Patent from 20 August 1907 (V) | Second Lieutenant |
| 1 December 1914 | Oberleutnant | First Lieutenant |
| 27 January 1917 | Hauptmann (19) | Captain |
| 1 May 1928 | Major with Rank Seniority from 1 February 1928 | Major |
| 1 April 1932 | Oberstleutnant | Lieutenant Colonel |
| 1 July 1934 | Oberst | Colonel |
| 1 January 1938 | Generalmajor (2) | Major General |
| 31 January 1939 | Charakter als Generalleutnant | Honorary/Brevet rank as Lieutenant General |
| 1 August 1943 | Generalleutnant z. V. (—) | Lieutenant General "at disposal" |

== Awards and decorations ==
- Iron Cross (1914), 2nd and 1st Class
- Saxon Albert Order, Knight 2nd Class with Swords (SA3bX/AR2X)
- Saxon Military St. Henry Order, Knight’s Cross (SH3)
- Civil Order of Saxony, Knight 2nd Class with Swords (VR2X/SV3bX)
- Saxon Albert Order, Knight 1st Class with Swords (SA3aX/AR1X)
- Honour Cross of the World War 1914/1918 (1934) with Swords
- Wehrmacht Long Service Award, 4th to 1st Class
- Repetition Clasp 1939 to the Iron Cross 1914, 2nd and 1st Class
  - 2nd Class on 18 April 1942
  - 1st Class on 7 October 1942
- Winter Battle in the East 1941–42 Medal on 15 August 1942
- Hungarian Order of Merit, Commander's Cross on 9 September 1942
- German Cross in Gold on 15 December 1943 as Generalleutnant and commander rückwärtiges Armeegebiet (rear army area) 580

== Notes ==
Military offices
| Preceded by Oberst Hermann von Hanneken | Commander of Infanterie–Regiment Breslau; 1 December 1934 — 15 October 1935 | Succeeded by Renamed Infanterie–Regiment 49 |
| Preceded by Previously Infanterie–Regiment Breslau | Commander of Infanterie–Regiment 49; 15 October 1935 — 12 October 1937 | Succeeded by Oberst Friedrich-Wilhelm von Rothkirch und Panthen |
| Preceded by Generalleutnant Ludwig Müller | Kommandant des rückwärtigen Armeegebiets (Korück) 580; 17 December 1941 — 18 April 1945 | Succeeded by unit disbanded |
