= Heinrich Kirchweger =

Johann Gottfried Heinrich Kirchweger (12 June 1809 – 18 January 1899) was a German railway engineer. Heinrich Kirchweger was born on 12 June 1809 in Stettin, then part of the Kingdom of Prussia, now Szczecin in Poland. After attending the trade school in Berlin, Kirchweger worked with the industrialist Georg Henschel in Kassel.

== Career ==
In 1838 he became the technical operations manager of the Leipzig–Dresden Railway Company and, later, the Saxon-Bavarian Railway Company. In 1843 he took up a post with the newly founded Royal Hanoverian State Railways. Here he was responsible for the mechanical engineering, operations, maintenance and the procurement of running and rolling stock. Thanks to him, an organised maintenance system and standardised railway operations emerged.

He introduced feedwater preheating on locomotives using the Kirchweger condenser and introduced "Hanoverian standard locomotives" based on those built by Thomas Russell Crampton and Johann Friedrich Ludwig Wöhlert. In addition he produced plans for engines built by Georg Egestorff and pumps for Hanover's river water systems.

After the Kingdom of Hanover was annexed by Prussia and the Hanoverian State Railways disbanded, Kirchweger was transferred against his will to Saarbrücken. As a result, he resigned from state service, worked for a short while in a coach factory and finally returned to Hanover as a civil engineer.

== Honours ==
For his services to the railways he was given numerous honours. He became inter alia a freeman of the city of Hanover, a Knight of the Royal Guelphic Order, the Saxon Albert Order and the Swedish Order of Vasa.

== Death ==
Kirchweger died at the age of 89 in Hanover, Germany. His grave is located in the Engesohde town cemetery.

== See also ==
- List of railway pioneers
