= Castle Wagrain =

Austrian castle

Coordinates: 48°0′23″N 13°40′6″E

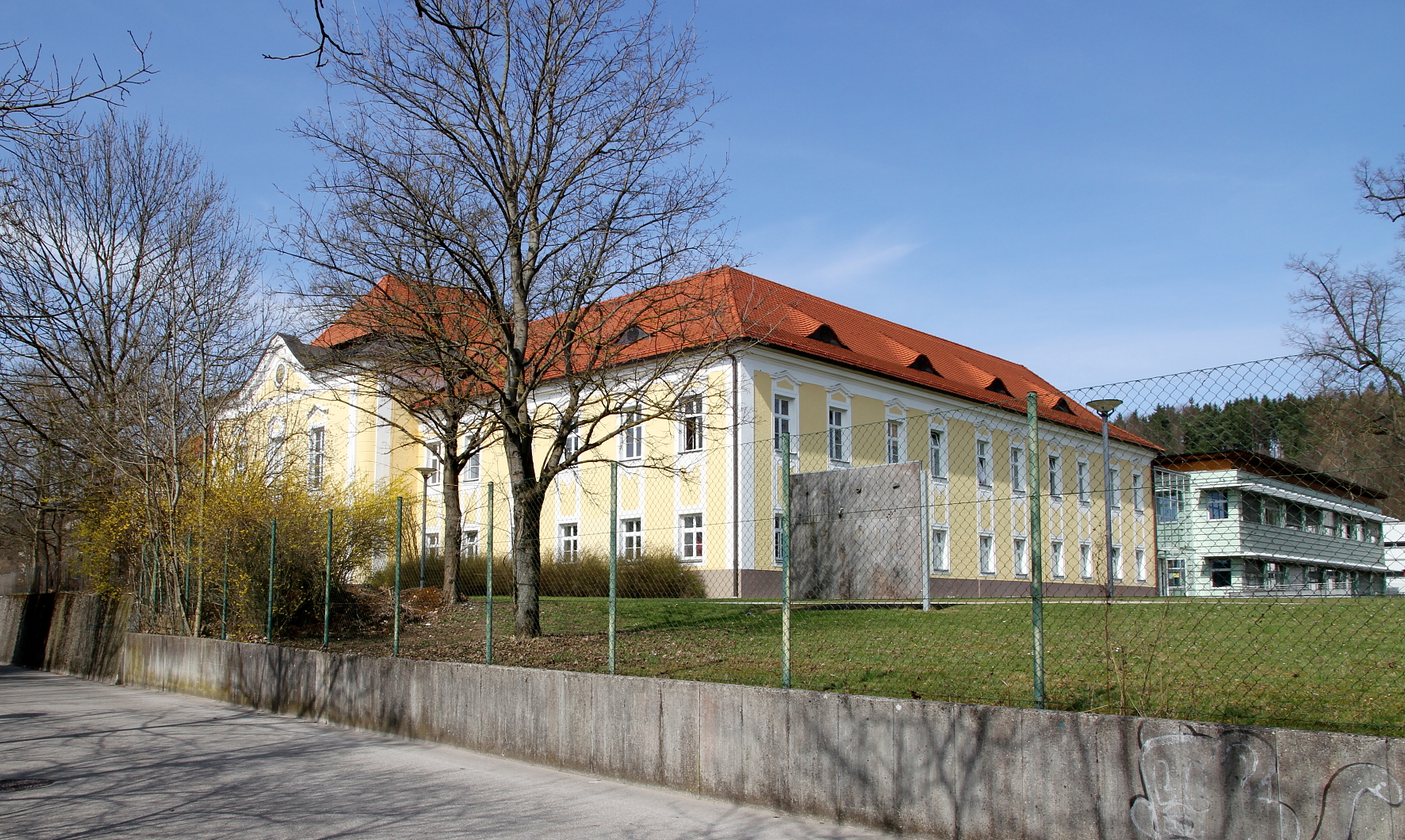
Castle Wagrain

Castle Wagrain is a castle in Vöcklabruck, Upper Austria, approximately one kilometre (0.62 mi) east of the town centre.

== History ==
The castle was first recorded in 1135. From 1447 onwards, it belonged to the Engl family of Steyr. In 1499, the property was raised to a noble estate by Emperor Maximilian I. Except for a religiously motivated break in 1620, the castle and its estate remained with the Engl family until the early 20th century. In 1717 the Engls were raised to Counts. With the death of Count Siegmund Engl in 1911, the male line became extinct. His daughter wedded a Count von Spiegelfeld. In 1950, the Spiegelfeld family sold the castle to the town of Vöcklabruck. Since then, it has been used as a school and for cultural purposes.

=== Schools ===
The following schools have been hosted by the castle:

- Bundesgymnasium Vöcklabruck (High School) 1950–69
- Höhere Technische Bundeslehranstalt Vöcklabruck (Superior Federal Technical School) 1969–85
- Hauptschule II Vöcklabruck/Hauptschule Regau (Vöcklabruck Secondary General School No. II/Regau Secondary General School) 1985–93
- Bundesrealgymnasium Vöcklabruck (High School) 1993–present

== Architecture ==
The present castle consists of two of the formerly four round towers, a main building, and two wings. Two of the original towers were demolished during an expansion in the 18th century. Thereby the gateway tower was completely erased. In 1980, the household building east of the castle was torn down to be replaced by a workshop. By the erection of an annex building in 2000, the previously U-shaped facility was enclosed and a courtyard created. The annex is a modern reinforced concrete construction with a flat roof. Its courtyard side is made up of glass.

The two-storey old part features a hip roof and a mansard gable. On the gable's southern front, the Engl family coat of arms is engraved with its motto: "1448 Fürchte Gott, Tue Recht, Scheue Niemand 1848 (Fear God, Act Just, Eschew None)". The arcades of the supplementary buildings have been glazed. Due to the school, the site can only be inspected from outside.

== Notable people ==
- Hans Ludwig Engel ( (1630–1674), a Roman Catholic canon lawyer, author

== Bibliography ==
- Dr. Satzinger, Franz (1985). Schloss Wagrain, Kurzer Abriss der Geschichte.
