= Emidio Taliani =

Italian Cardinal

His Eminence Emidio Taliani
- Cardinal-Priest of San Bernardo alle Terme
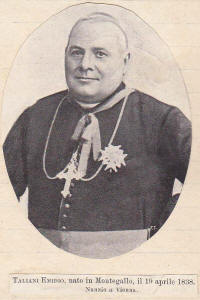
- Taliani in 1895.
- Church: Roman Catholic Church
- Appointed: 12 November 1903
- Term ended: 24 August 1907
- Predecessor: Giuseppe Melchiorre Sarto
- Successor: Pietro Gasparri
- Previous posts: Titular Archbishop of Sebastia (1896-1903); Apostolic Nuncio to Austria-Hungary (1896-1903)

Orders
- Ordination: 20 October 1861
- Consecration: 29 June 1896 by Lucido Maria Parocchi
- Created cardinal: 22 June 1903 by Pope Leo XIII
- Rank: Cardinal-Priest

Personal details
- Born: Emidio Taliani; 19 April 1838 Montegallo, Papal States
- Died: 24 August 1907 (aged 69) Montegallo, Kingdom of Italy
- Parents: Nicola Taliani; Rosa Cecchini
- Education: University of Rome

Styles of Emidio Taliani
- Reference style: His Eminence
- Spoken style: Your Eminence
- Informal style: Cardinal
- See: none

Emidio Taliani (19 April 1838 – 24 August 1907) was an Italian Cardinal of the Roman Catholic Church. He served as Nuncio to Austria from 1896 to 1903, and was elevated to the cardinalate in 1903.

== Biography ==
Emidio Taliani was born in Montegallo, and studied at the University of Rome, from where he obtained his doctorates in theology and in canon and civil law. He was ordained to the priesthood on 20 October 1861, and later served as secretary to Cardinal Carlo Sacconi.

After being raised to the rank of Privy Chamberlain supernumerary, Taliani became auditor (16 May 1869) and chargé d'affaires (1870) of the nunciature to Germany. He was made a Domestic Prelate of His Holiness in 1871, and was sent to the nunciature to France, where he served as auditor from 1875 to 1879. Taliani then entered the service of the Roman Curia upon being named a referendary prelate of the Supreme Tribunal of the Apostolic Signature on 17 March 1880. In 1885, he was made protonotary apostolic participant (16 March) and auditor of the Roman Rota (18 May). He later became vicar of the Archpriest of the Lateran Basilica, Cardinal Francesco Satolli, in 1889.

On 22 June 1896, Taliani was appointed Titular Archbishop of Sebastea by Pope Leo XIII, receiving his episcopal consecration on the following 29 June from Cardinal Lucido Parocchi. He was named Nuncio to Austria on 24 July of the same year. As Nuncio, he served as both the Pope's representative or ambassador to that country. Taliani was made a

- Grand Cross of the Order of Saint Stephen of Hungary (1903)
- Commander 2nd Class of the Order of Albert (Saxony, 1870)
- Commander of the Royal Order of Francis I (Naples)
- Commander of the Order of Charles III (Spain)
- Légion d'honneur (France)

Pope Leo XIII created him a cardinal in the consistory of 22 June 1903, whereupon he ceased to serve as Nuncio. Later that year, Taliani participated in the papal conclave which selected Leo's successor, Pope Pius X. The latter created Taliani as Cardinal-Priest of San Bernardo alle Terme (the pope's former title) since Leo XIII was unable to confer the title before his death.

Cardinal Taliani died in his native Montegallo, at the age of 69. After lying in state in the Cathedral of Ascoli, his body was buried in his family's tomb at the cemetery of Ascoli.

Catholic Church titles
Preceded by Antonio Agliardi	Nuncio to Austria; 1896–1903	Succeeded by Gennaro Granito Pignatelli di Belmonte
