= Giovanni Clericato =

Italian canon lawyer

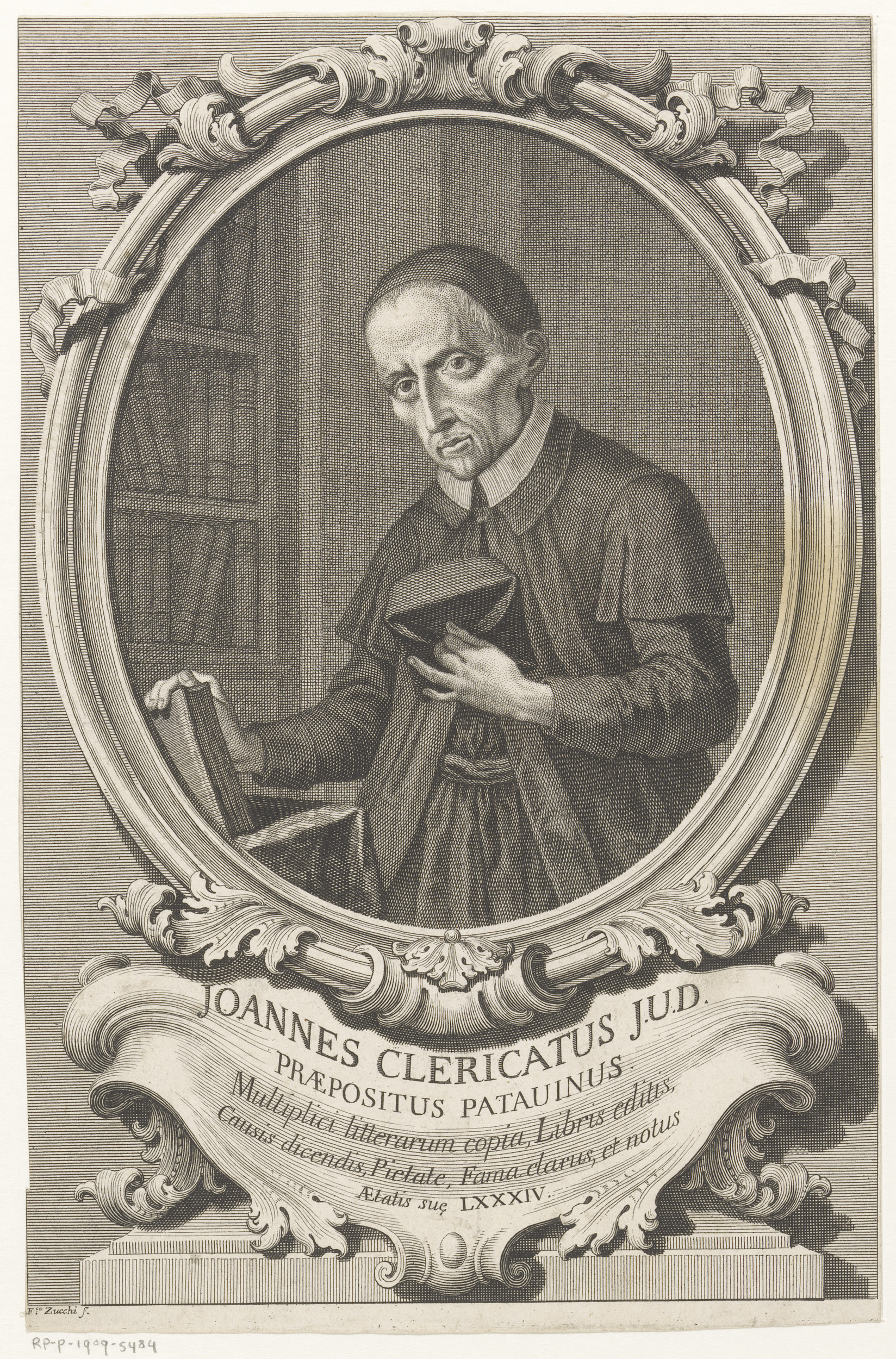
Giovanni Maria Chiericato

Giovanni Clericato (1633, at Padua – 1717) was an Italian canon lawyer.

== Life ==
The patronage of a pious woman made it possible for him to study. As a priest, he came to be considered one of the ablest men of his time in matters of ecclesiastical jurisprudence. Cardinal Barbarigo, whose life he afterwards wrote, made him Vicar-General of the Diocese of Padua.

== Works ==
He wrote many works on civil and canon law; his "Decisiones Sacramentales" was published in 1727, and in 1757 in three volumes, and was praised by Pope Benedict XIV (notific. 32, n. 6).
