= Wilhelm Molitor =

German poet, priest, and jurist (1819–1880)

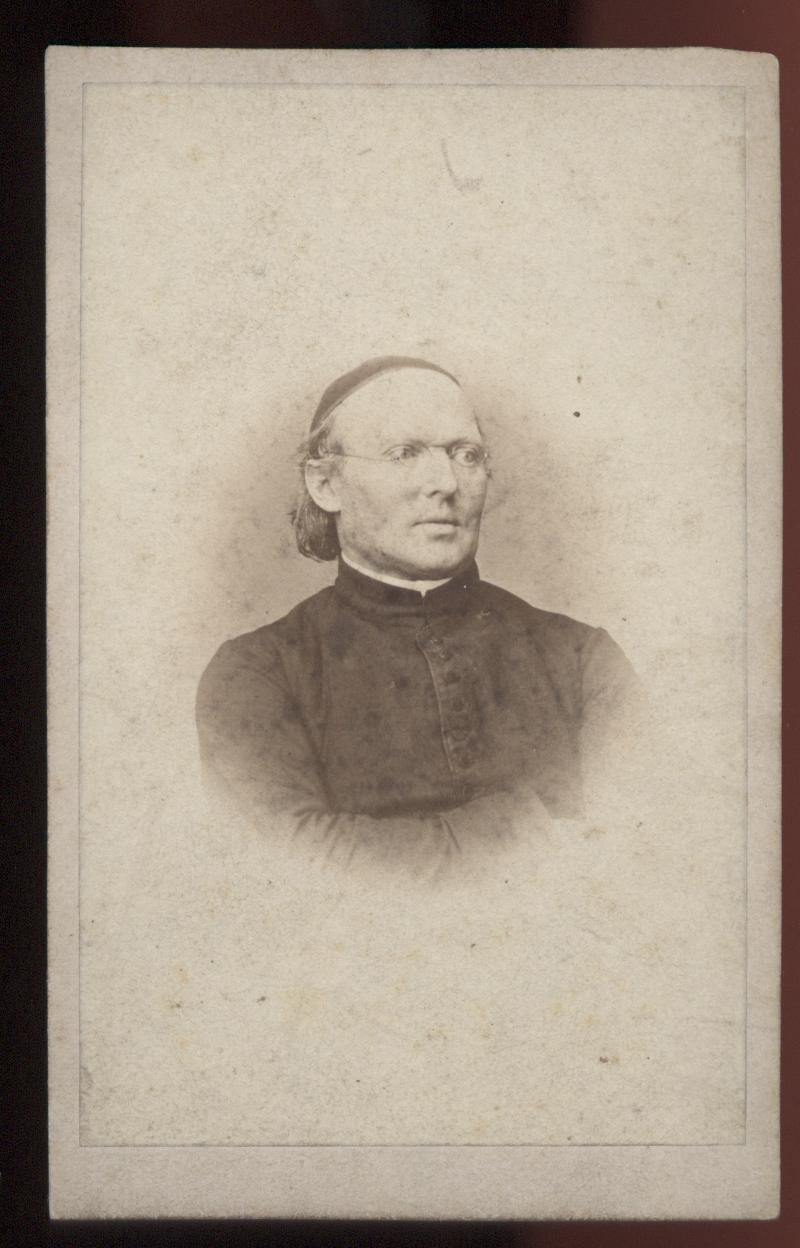
Wilhelm Molitor

Wilhelm Molitor (24 August 1819 – 11 January 1880), known by the pseudonyms Ulric Riesler and Benno Bronner, was a German poet, novelist, canon lawyer and publicist, and Roman Catholic priest. He was a chief promoter of the Catholic movement in the Palatinate.

== Life ==
Molitor was born at Zweibrücken in the Rhine Palatinate. After studying philosophy and jurisprudence in Munich and Heidelberg (1836–1840), he held various juridical positions in the service of the state from 1843 to 1849. Feeling himself called to the priesthood, he studied theology at Bonn (1849–1851) and was ordained priest on 15 March 1851.

In the same year he became secretary to Nicolaus von Weis, Bishop of Speyer; on 11 November 1857, he was elected canon of the cathedral chapter and, soon after, appointed custos of the cathedral, and professor of archæology and homiletics at the episcopal seminary.

He took part in the consultations of the German bishops at Bamberg (1867), Würzburg (1868), and Fulda (1869). In 1868 Pope Pius IX summoned him to Rome as a consultor, ahead of the First Vatican Council.

From 1875 to 1877 he was a member of the Bavarian Landtag. His ultramontane principles made him unacceptable to the Bavarian Government, which in consequence repeatedly prevented his election to the See of Speyer. He founded the "Pfälzicher Pressverein", the daily paper "Rheinpfalz" and the "Katholische Vereinsdruckerei".

Molitor died at Speyer.

== Works ==
He is the author of numerous poems, dramas, novels, sketches on the questions of the day, and a few juridical treatises. A collection of his poems was published in 1884; his "Domlieder" in 1846. His dramas are:

- "Kynast" (1844);
- "Maria Magdalena" (1863, 1874);
- "Das alte deutsche Handwerk" (1864);
- "Die Freigelassene Neros" (1865);
- "Claudia Procula" (1867);
- "Julian der Apostat" (1867);
- "Des Kaisers Guenstling", a tragedy of the times of the martyrs (1874);
- "Die Blume von Sicilien" (1880, 1897);
- "Dramatische Spiele", containing the dramatic legend "Sankt Ursulas Rheinfahrt", the comedy "Die Villa bei Amalfi", and the dramatic tale "Schön Gundel" (1878);
- and his three festive plays, "Weihnachtsbaum" (1867), "Das Hans zu Nazareth" (1872), and "Die Weisen des Morgenlands" (1877).

His novels are:

- "Die schöne Zweibrückerin", 2 vols. (1844);
- "Der Jesuit" (1873);
- "Herr von Syllabus" (1873);
- "Memoiren eines Todtenkopfs", 2 vols. (1875);
- "Der Caplan von Friedlingen" (1877);
- "Der Gast im Kyffhäuser" (1880).

His juridical works are:

- "Ueber kanonisches Gerichtsverfahren gegen Cleriker" (1856);
- "Die Immunität des Domes zu Speyer" (1859); "Die Decretale Per Venerabilem" (1876).

He also wrote:

- three volumes of sermons (1880–1882);
- "Das Theater in seiner Bedeutung und in seiner gegenwärtigen Stellung" (1866);
- "Ueber Goethes Faust" (1869);
- "Brennende Fragen" (1874);
- "Die Grossmacht der Presse" and "Die Organisation der Katholischen Presse" (1866).

In collaboration with Franz Hülskamp he wrote "Papst Pius IX in seinem Leben und Wirken", 4th ed. (1875) and in collaboration with Wittmer "Rom, Wegweiser durch die ewige Stadt" (1866, 1870).
