= Hans Ludwig Engel =

Hans Ludwig Engel (1630–22 April 1674) was a Roman Catholic canon lawyer, best known as the author of Collegium Universi Juris Canonici.

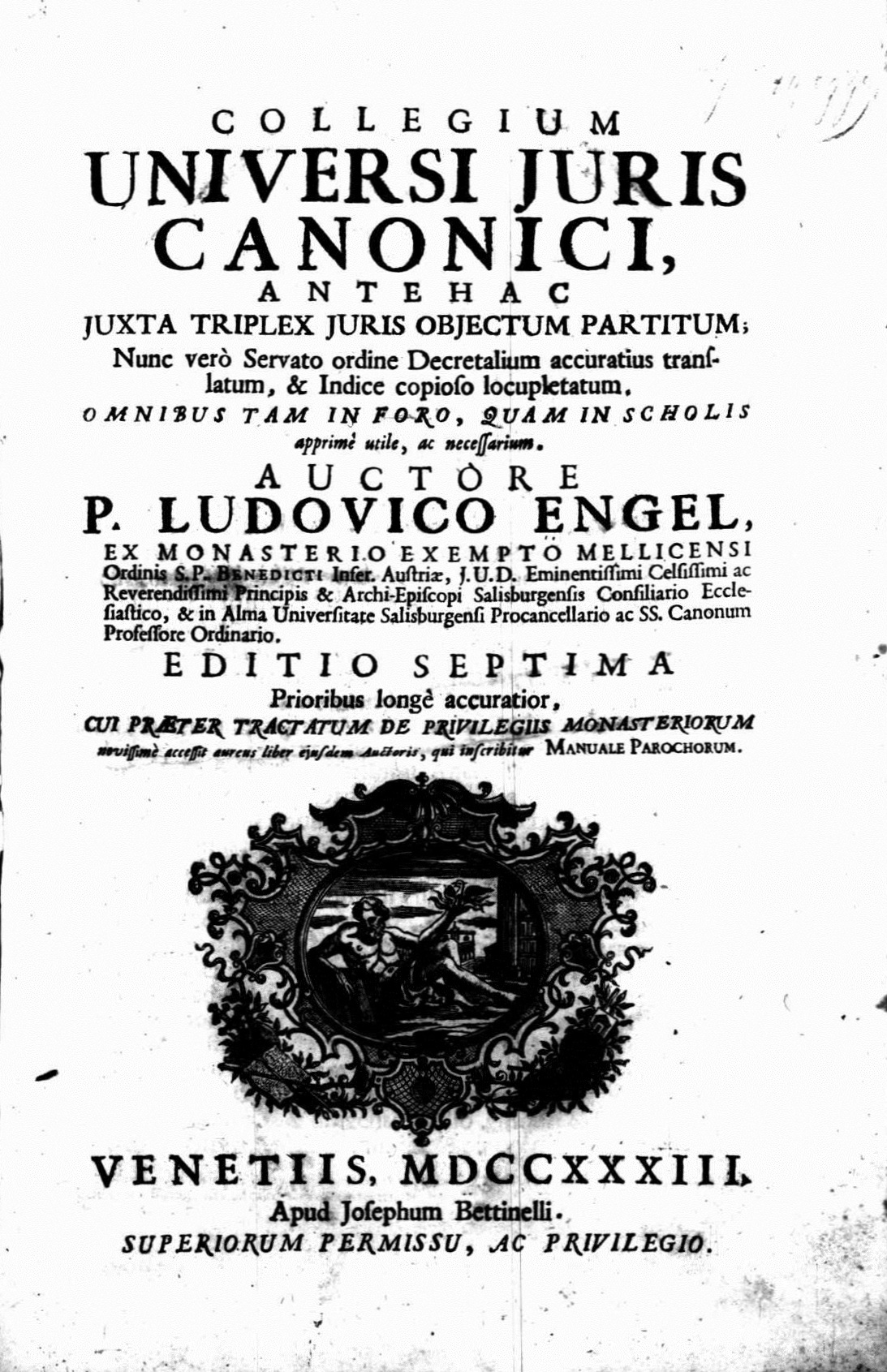
Collegium universi iuris canonici, 1733

== Life ==
Hans Ludwig Engel was born at Castle Wagrain, Austria. He became a Benedictine at Melk Abbey, 10 September 1654. At the order of his abbot, he applied himself to the study of law at the University of Salzburg, where theological studies were committed to the care of the Benedictines.

He was proclaimed doctor of civil and canon law in 1657, ordained priest the following year, and was soon professor of canon law at the university. He published scholarly works under the name Ludwig Engel or, using its Latin form, Ludovicus Engel.

In 1669 Engel was unanimously chosen vice-chancellor of the university. He left Salzburg in 1674 at the invitation of the Abbot of Melk, who hoped that Engel should become known and appreciated by the monks and be chosen as his successor, but Engel died at Grillenberg (Hernstein) on 22 April 1674.

== Selected works ==
- Manuale parochorum (Salzburg, 1661);
- Forum competens (Salzburg, 1663);
- Tractatus de privilegiis et juribus monasteriorum (Salzburg, 1664);
- Collegium universi juris canonici, etc. (Salzburg, 1671–1674), a work running to a fifteenth edition in 1770. A summary was published in 1720 by Mainardus Schwartz.
