= Francesco Antonio Begnudelli-Basso =

Austrian canon lawyer

- Born: Trento, Holy Roman Empire
- Died: October 9, 1713; Freising, Holy Roman Empire
- Occupation: Canon lawyer
- Known for: Bibliotheca juris canonico-civilis practica
- Notable work: Bibliotheca juris canonico-civilis practica seu repertorium quaestionum magis practicarum in utroque foro

Francesco Antonio Begnudelli-Basso (born at Trento; died at Freising, 9 October 1713) was an Austrian canon lawyer.

== Life ==
From 1675 he was Vicar-General of the Diocese of Trent, his native place. In 1679, however, he held a canonry in Freising Cathedral, where in 1696 he became vicar-general of the diocese, and where he died.

== Works ==
His "Bibliotheca juris canonico-civilis practica seu repertoium quaestionum magis practicarum in utroque foro" established him among the canonists of his day. He speaks in the clearest terms of papal infallibility. The work was published in Freising in 1712, for vols. in folio; Geneva, 1747; Modena and Venice, 1758. It was made effectively obsolete by later editions of Lucius Ferraris's "Bibliotheca".
