= Friedrich August Eckstein =

German classical philologist and teacher (1810–1885)

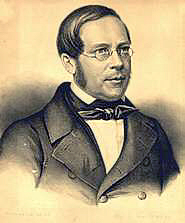
Friedrich August Eckstein.

Friedrich August Eckstein (6 May 1810 – 15 November 1885) was a German classical philologist and educator born in Halle an der Saale.

He studied philology at the University of Halle, earning his doctorate in 1831. In 1839 he became head of the Royal Pädagogium in Halle, and in 1849 was appointed Kondirektor at the Franckesche Stiftungen (Francke Foundation). In 1863 he moved to Leipzig as an adjunct professor at the University and as rector of the Thomanerchor. He held the title of rector at the Thomanerchor until 1881.

Eckstein died in Leipzig.

== Selected publications ==
- Chronik der Stadt Halle; ("Chronicle of Halle an der Saale"; 6 volumes), Halle 1842/43.
- Familiaris interpretatio primae satirae Horatianae, 1865.
- Nomenclator philologorum; Teubner, Leipzig 1871.
- Lateinischer Unterricht. Geschichte und Methode ("Latin lessons, history and method"); second edition, Gotha 1880.
- Lateinischer und griechischer Unterricht ("Latin and Greek lessons"), Leipzig 1887.
