= Astesanus of Asti =

Franciscan canon lawyer and theologian

- Born: Unknown; Asti, Piedmont
- Died: c. 1330
- Occupations: Franciscan canon lawyer, theologian
- Known for: Summa de casibus conscientiae (Summa Astesana)

Astesanus of Asti (died c. 1330) was an important Franciscan canon lawyer and theologian, from Asti in Piedmont. His major work is Summa de casibus conscientiae (Cases of conscience), a confessional work, in manuscript from around 1317 and comprising eight volumes and three indices. Its writing is said to have been at the prompting of Cardinal Giovanni Gaetano Orsini.

It is often referred to as the Summa Astesana. The parts named De significatione verborum are a reference for the legal usage of his period, for both civil and canon law. The Canones penitentiales are also cited separately. It was printed at Strasbourg at the end of the 1460s by Johannes Mentelin, Lyons 1519; Rome 1728–30.

== Works ==
- Summa de casibus conscientiae. Johann Mentelin, Straßburg not after 1469 digital
