= Bonifazio Vitalini =

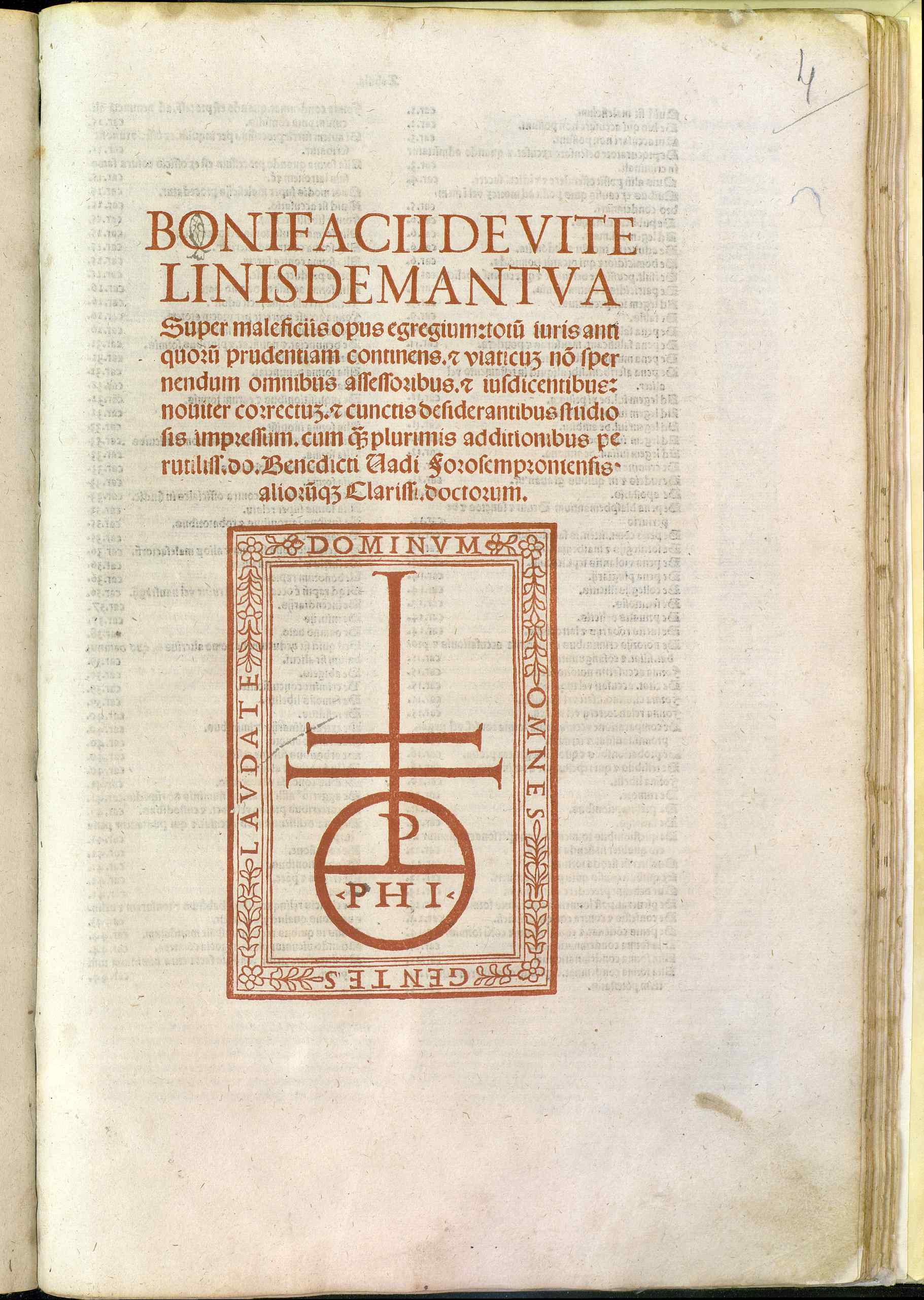
Super maleficiis, 1518

Bonifazio Vitalini (De Vitalinis) (b. at Mantua, Italy, about 1320; d. at Avignon after 1388) was an Italian jurist. It is now supposed that his name has become attached to works of Bonifacius Antelmi, somewhat earlier, and others. These attributions came with the era of printing.

== Life ==
After completing his law studies at Padua, he returned to his native city and took up the practice of criminal law. He suddenly gave up the law, entered the priesthood, and left Padua with the intention of never returning.

In 1350, however, he came back as rector of the Church of San Martinio de' Tribesii and vicar of the bishop. Two years after he went to Avignon, where he received a professorship. He was given the privilege of granting the doctorate, was made prothonotary Apostolic, advocate of the Consistory, fiscal of the Roman Curia, and finally auditor of the sacred palace. He is known to have been in various Italian cities, and at Avignon in 1388.

== Attributed works ==
- "Super maleficiis" (Milan, 1505; Venice, 1518, 1559, 1584; Lyons, 1558; Frankfort, 1600 and 1604), on criminal procedure
  - Super maleficiis (in Latin). Venice: Filippo Penzi. 1518.
- A commentary on the Clementines entitled "Comentarii in Constitutiones Clementis Papae V in alma Avenionensi universitate editi" (Lyons, 1522); by Bonifacius Ammannati
- "Solemnis ac perutilis tractatus de modo procedendi contra apostatas" (Venice, 1556)
- "Tractatus, qui casus respirat speciale mandatum" (Zürich, 1584).
