= Ferdinand Walter =

German jurist and professor

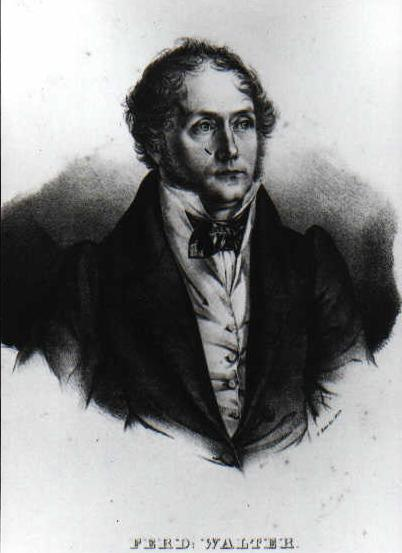
Ferdinand Walter

Ferdinand Walter (born at Wetzlar, 30 November 1794; died at Bonn, 13 December 1879) was a German jurist, member of the Prussian National Assembly and professor at the University of Bonn.

== Life ==
After studying at the Latin school of Mülheim on the Rhine (1805-9), and later at Cologne (1809-13), he fought against Napoleon I in 1814, as a volunteer in a Russian regiment. In autumn, 1814, he began to study jurisprudence at Heidelberg, where he graduated, 22 November 1817. He remained at Heidelberg as Privatdozent until Easter, 1819, where he was called to the newly founded University of Bonn. He taught various juristic branches there until 1875, when he resigned on account of blindness.

A layman, Walter was a strenuous champion of the rights of the Catholic Church against civil encroachment. He was a member of the Prussian National Assembly in 1848 and of the First Chamber of Deputies in 1849. In a special pamphlet (1848) he opposed the incorporation into the criminal code of an article allowing the State to deprive the clergy of ecclesiastical rights, and on 4 October 1849, he delivered an oration in defense of ecclesiastical independence in the management of church affairs.

== Works ==
His most famous work is his "Lehrbuch des Kirchenrechts" (Bonn, 1822) [Canon law textbook OCLC 258551471]. The eighth edition was translated into French and Spanish, the ninth into Italian. A fourteenth edition was prepared by Canon Gerlach, one of Walter's disciples (Bonn, 1871). The sources of canon law, which were added as an appendix to the sixth edition of the "Kirchenrecht", he materially enlarged and published separately as "Fontes juris ecclesiastici antiqui et hodierni" (Bonn, 1862). His other important works are: "Corpus juris Germanici antiqui" (3 vols., Bonn, 1824); "Romische Rechtsgeschichte" (Bonn, 1836); "Deutsche Rechtsgeschichte" (Bonn, 1853); "System des deutschen Privatrechts" (Bonn, 1855); "Das alte Wales", (Bonn, 1859), on the history, laws, and religion of ancient Wales; "Juristische Encyclopadic" (Bonn, 1856); "Naturrecht und Politik" (Bonn, 1863); "Aus meinem Leben" (Bonn, 1865), an autobiography; "Das alte Erz stift und die Reichsstadt Koln" (Bonn, 1866), a civil history of the former electorate of Cologne, left unfinished.
