= Count Nikolaus Szécsen von Temerin =

Austro-Hungarian diplomat

Nikolaus Graf Szécsen von Temerin
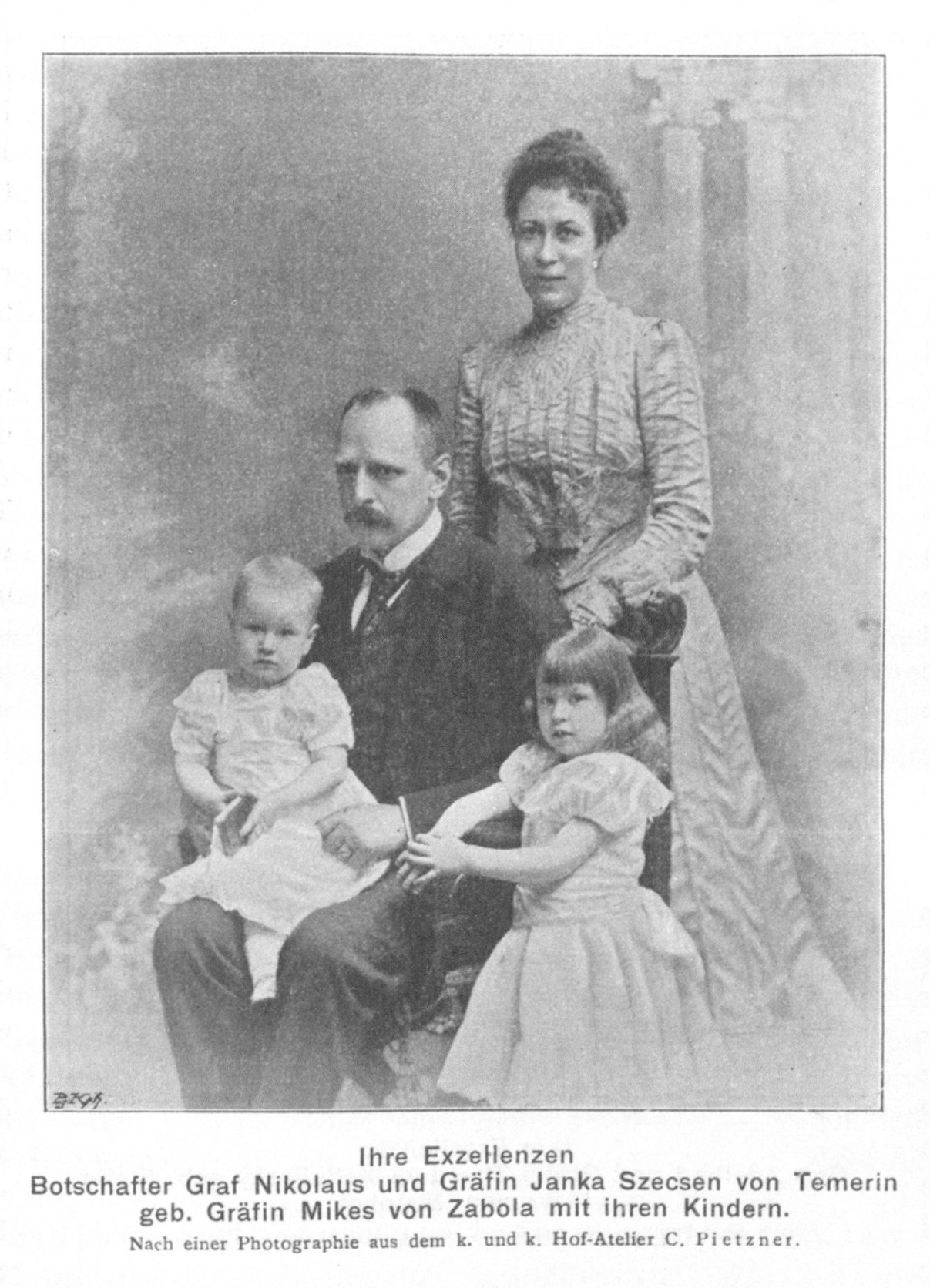

Second Section Chief in the Imperial Foreign Ministry
- In office 9 November 1895 – 27 January 1900
- Preceded by: Adalbert Graf Cziráky von Czirák und Dénesfalva
- Succeeded by: Heinrich Graf von Lützow zu Drey-Lützow und Seedorf

First Section Chief in the Imperial Foreign Ministry
- In office 27 January 1900 – 29 November 1901
- Preceded by: Rudolf Graf von Welsersheimb
- Succeeded by: Heinrich Graf von Lützow zu Drey-Lützow und Seedorf

Austro-Hungarian Ambassador to the Holy See
- In office 29 November 1901 – 23 January 1911
- Preceded by: Friedrich Graf Revertera von Salandra
- Succeeded by: Johann Prinz von Schönburg-Hartenstein

Austro-Hungarian Ambassador to France
- In office 23 January 1911 – 10 August 1914
- Preceded by: Rudolf Graf von Khevenhüller-Metsch
- Succeeded by: None

Personal details
- Born: 26 November 1857 Temerin, Voivodeship of Serbia and Banat of Temeschwar, Austrian Empire (now Serbia)
- Died: 18 May 1926 (aged 68) Gyöngyösszentkereszt, Hungary
- Spouse(s): Johanna, née Gräfin Mikes von Zabola (1866–1930)
- Children: Ernesztina Johanna; Miklós Antal Károly; Johanna

Nikolaus (Anton) Graf Szécsen von Temerin (Hungarian: gróf temerini Szécsen Miklós) (26 November 1857 – 18 May 1926), was an Austro-Hungarian diplomat of Hungarian origin serving as ambassador at Paris at the outbreak of World War I.

== Life ==
Born in Temerin on 26 November 1857 into the Hungarian nobility as son of Anton Graf Szécsen von Temerin (1819–1896), an Austro-Hungarian government minister. In 1896, he married Johanna Gräfin Mikes von Zabola (1866–1930) in Vienna.

Count Szécsen joined the Austro-Hungarian foreign service and served inter alia in Rome. In November 1895, he was appointed Second Section Chief at the Foreign Ministry in Vienna and was promoted to First Section Chief in January 1900. At the insistence of Count Tisza, he was appointed despite his relatively limited experience to serve as the Dual Monarchy's ambassador to the Holy See in November 1901, a prominent posting given the close connections between the House of Habsburg and the papacy.

Count Szécsen, considered an able diplomat with a "solid, practical mind and a masterful grasp of the workings of diplomacy", apparently turned down an offer to succeed Count von Aehrenthal as ambassador to St. Petersburg upon the latter's appointment as Minister of Foreign Affairs in 1906.

In early January 1911, Count Szécsen was appointed as ambassador to France, considered one of the most prestigious ambassadorships at the time, and presented his credentials on 21 March. In that capacity, he played a key role during the July Crisis in 1914. After returning to Vienna, he became a member of the Upper House (Herrenhaus) in 1916 and served as a Hofmarschall in Hungary from 1916 to 1918.

Count Szécsen had been invested as a Knight of the Order of the Golden Fleece in 1908.

His son Nikolaus was executed by Russian soldiers at Mór, Hungary, on 28 March 1945.

Count Szécsen died in Gyöngyösszentkereszt on 18 May 1926.

Diplomatic posts
Preceded by Adalbert Graf Cziráky von Czirák und Dénesfalva	Second Section Chief in the Imperial Foreign Ministry; 1895–1900	Succeeded by Heinrich Graf von Lützow zu Drey-Lützow und Seedorf
Preceded by Rudolf Graf von Welsersheimb	First Section Chief in the Imperial Foreign Ministry; 1900–1901	Succeeded by Heinrich Graf von Lützow zu Drey-Lützow und Seedorf
Preceded by Friedrich Graf Revertera von Salandra	Austro-Hungarian Ambassador to the Holy See; 1901–1911	Succeeded by Johann Prinz von Schönburg-Hartenstein
Preceded by Rudolf Graf von Khevenhüller-Metsch	Austro-Hungarian Ambassador to France; 1911–1914	Succeeded by None
