= Ladislaus Hengelmüller von Hengervár =

Imperial Austria-Hungarian ambassador to the US

Ladislaus Freiherr Hengelmüller von Hengervár
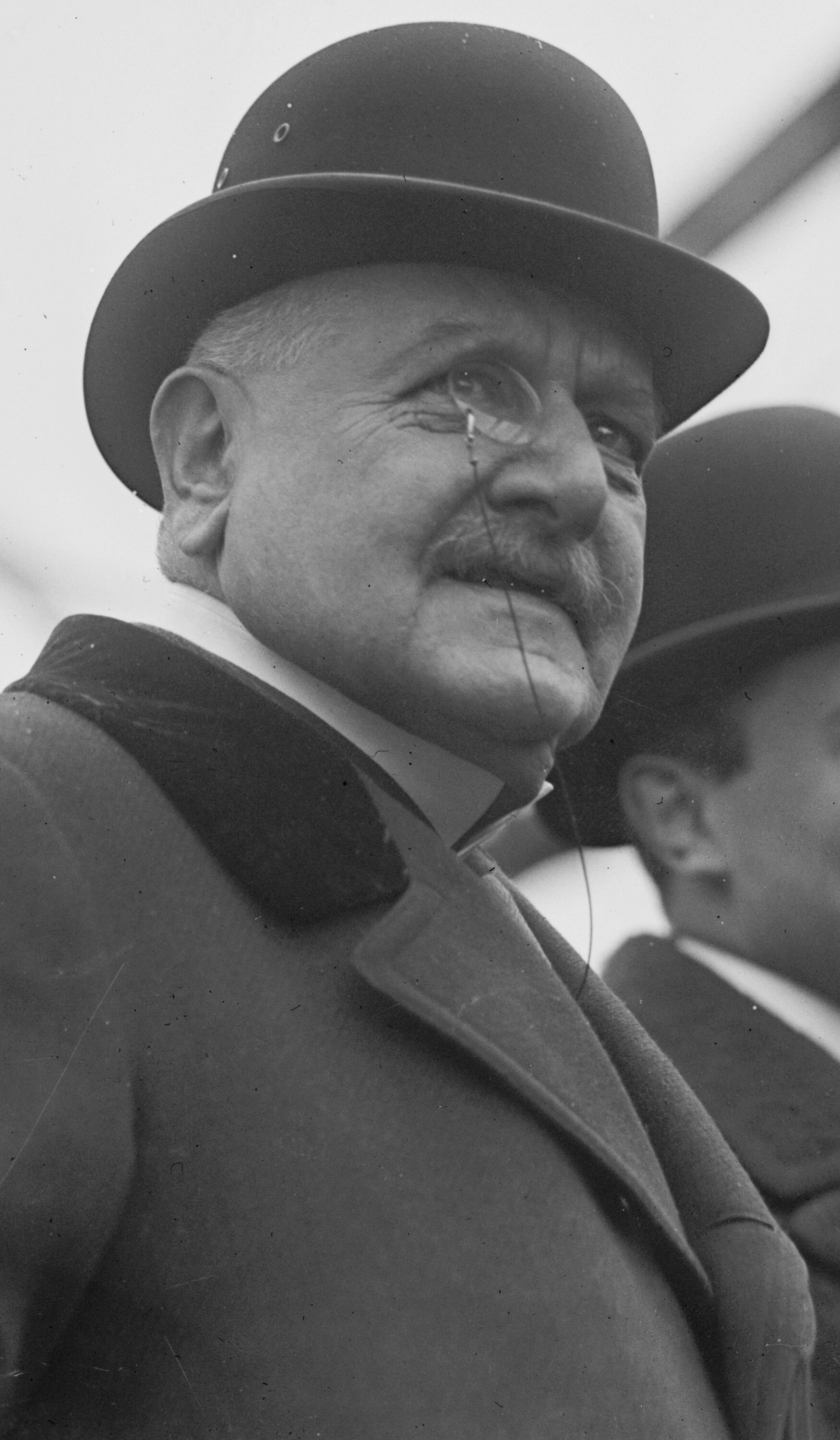

Austro-Hungarian Minister to Serbia
- In office 21 February 1887 – 30 July 1889
- Preceded by: Rudolf Graf von Khevenhüller-Metsch
- Succeeded by: Gustav Freiherr von Thömmel

Austro-Hungarian Minister to Brazil
- In office 4 March 1891 – 7 May 1893
- Preceded by: Rudolf Graf von Welsersheimb
- Succeeded by: Ernst Ritter Schmit von Tavera

Austro-Hungarian Ambassador to the United States
- In office 11 October 1894 – 7 January 1913
- Preceded by: Ernst Ritter Schmit von Tavera
- Succeeded by: Konstantin Dumba

Personal details
- Born: 2 May 1845 Pest, Austria-Hungary (now Hungary)
- Died: 22 April 1917 (aged 71) Abbazia, Austria-Hungary (now Croatia)
- Spouse(s): Marie, Countess Dunin-Borkowska

Freiherr Ladislaus Hengelmüller von Hengervár (Hungarian: hengervári báró Hengelmüller László; 2 May 1845 – 22 April 1917), was an Austro-Hungarian diplomat of Hungarian origin who was a long-term Ambassador at Washington D.C., throughout many Presidential administrations including those of William McKinley, Theodore Roosevelt and William Taft.

== Early life ==
Born in Pest (now Budapest) on 2 May 1845 into an ethnic German family in Hungary. His father Michael Hengelmüller was an Austrian court official.

== Career ==
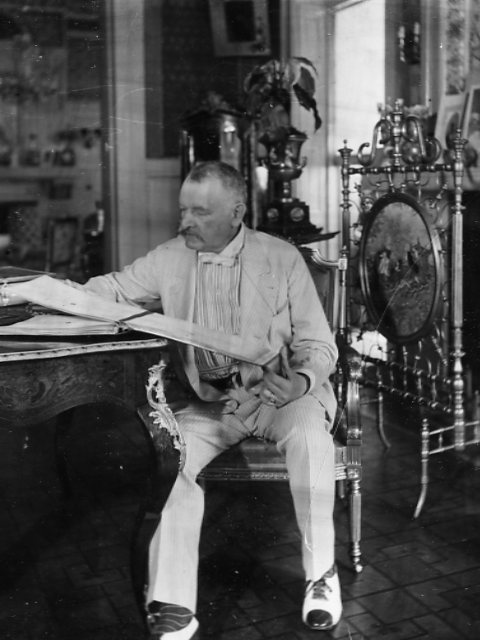
Baron Hengelmüller, c. 1900

After having served in the Chancellery of the Royal Hungarian Court and the Ministry of Finance, Hengelmüller began his diplomatic career. In 1868, he was appointed as Chancellor of the General consulate for China and Japan, and then served briefly in the Foreign Ministry in Vienna. Following a stint at the Consulate in Budapest, he was stationed in Washington D.C. and Berlin from 1870 to 1874. In 1875, he was responsible for the preparations of a commercial treaty with Germany and was thereafter dispatched to Paris in 1876 and to London in 1879. It was in this latter posting, where he remained for almost a decade, where he distinguished himself and acquired a reputation for shrewdness. One of his achievements during this time was to obtain a public apology by Britain's Prime Minister William Gladstone, who was well known for his stubbornness.

In 1887, Hengelmüller was appointed to serve as minister at Belgrade in the wake of the Serbo-Bulgarian War of 1885-1886 and had to exercise a restraining influence on Serbian King Milan I, whose throne depended on Austro-Hungarian support. In 1889, he was ennobled as Hengelmüller von Hengervár and appointed a Privy Counsellor (Geheimrat). In 1891, he became minister at Rio de Janeiro.

=== Minister at Washington D.C. ===
Hengelmüller von Hengervár was appointed to serve as minister at Washington D.C. in 1894. Described as clever and experienced, Hengelmüller von Hengervár became greatly popular and well-respected during his long period of service in Washington D.C.

In late 1902, he was informed that his legation would be upgraded to an embassy and that he would be promoted to the rank of ambassador. Already in 1896 had he lobbied Emperor Franz Joseph I and Foreign Minister Goluchowski to raise the status of his mission. On 27 December, he presented his credentials to President Roosevelt and became the first ambassador of Austria-Hungary to the United States.

In the autumn of 1906, his name was one of those advanced as a successor to Count Goluchowski as Imperial Foreign Minister, but the post eventually went to an old friend Count Lexa von Aehrenthal. On 13 December 1906, he was elevated to the rank of Baron, one of the few products of the nineteenth century nobility among senior Austro-Hungarian diplomats.

Baron Hengelmüller von Hengervár was present on 10 January 1908 at the Waldorf-Astoria in New York City when the American Priory of the Sovereign Order of Saint John of Jerusalem was officially incorporated. In 1909, he signed an arbitration treaty between the United States and the Austro-Hungarian Empire, which provided for a Permanent Court of Arbitration at The Hague.

On 23 February 1910, he became dean of the diplomatic corps in Washington D.C.

When former President Roosevelt, with whom he had become a good friend, visited Austria-Hungary in 1910, he was one of the hosts and Roosevelt also wrote the preface of the Baron's book on Prince Rákóczi, a Hungarian leader of an uprising against the Habsburgs in the eighteenth century, in 1913. It could be noted though that the Baron's own Hungarian skills were considered rather weak although he was considered an eminent linguist in diplomatic circles.

On a more anecdotal level, Baron Hengelmüller von Hengervár was subject to a quote by the then President Taft: "Let him wait", Taft told Captain Butt regarding the Austro-Hungarian Ambassador's impatience over a delayed appointment. "A man with the name of Hengelmuller should not want me to leave my lunch".

In the autumn of 1912, he formally announced his retirement and that he would return to Vienna after close to twenty years in Washington D.C. His long years of service, along with the fact that his friend Count Lexa von Aehrenthal had died earlier that year, likely contributed to this end. He was succeeded as US Ambassador by Konstantin Dumba, who held the post until 1915 when he was declared persona non grata and expelled from the country by President Wilson.

Baron Hengelmüller von Hengervár was appointed a lifetime member of the Hungarian House of Magnates in 1910.

== Personal life ==
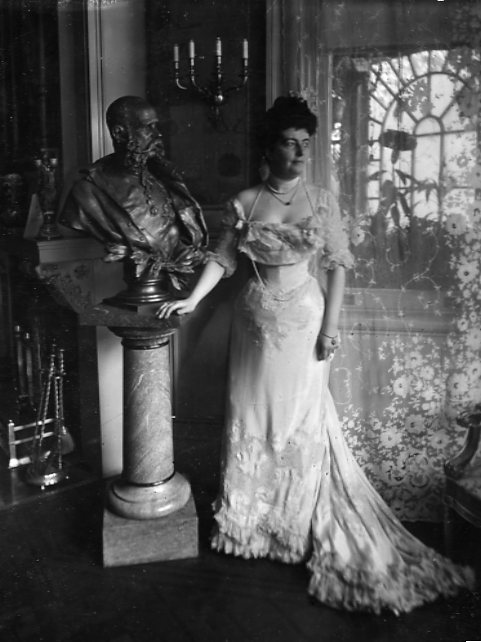
Countess Marie Hengelmüller von Hengervár, née Dunin-Borkowska

On 3 April 1893, he married Marie née Countess Dunin-Borkowska (b. 1859), a widow and daughter of Count Alfred Dunin-Borkowski (1834–1895), in Dresden. Together, they were the parents of:

- Michaela "Mila" Hengenmüller von Hengervar (1899–1919), who married Baron Elek Alexius Biedermann von Turony.

Baron Hengelmüller von Hengelvár died on 22 April 1917 at Abbazia (now Opatija), one of the leading health resorts of the Habsburg Empire located in Istria.

His summer residence in Maine from his years in the United States today operates as a bed and breakfast.

== Works ==
- Franz Rákóczi und sein Kampf für Ungarns Freiheit 1703-1711, Berlin, Deutsche Verlags-Anstalt, 1913 (translation as Hungary's fight for national existence, or the history of the great uprising led by Francis Rakoczi II. 1703-1711, London, Macmillan, 1913).
- Austria-Hungary and the War (together with Albert Graf Apponyi von Nagy-Appony, Konstantin Dumba and Alexander Nuber von Pereked), New York, Austro-Hungarian Consulate-general, 1915.

Diplomatic posts
Preceded by Rudolf Graf von Khevenhüller-Metsch	Austro-Hungarian Minister to Serbia; 1887–1889	Succeeded by Gustav Freiherr von Thömmel
Preceded by Rudolf Graf von Welsersheimb	Austro-Hungarian Minister to Brazil; 1891–1893	Succeeded by Ernst Ritter Schmit von Tavera
Preceded by Ernst Ritter Schmit von Tavera	Austro-Hungarian Ambassador to the United States; 1894–1913	Succeeded by Konstantin Dumba
