= List of ambassadors of Austria-Hungary to France =

This is a list of the heads of mission from the Habsburg Monarchy, Austrian Empire, and later Austria-Hungary, to France.

== History ==
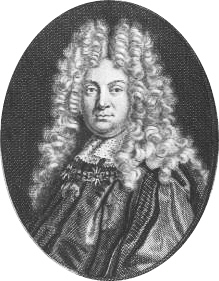
Philipp Ludwig Wenzel von Sinzendorf

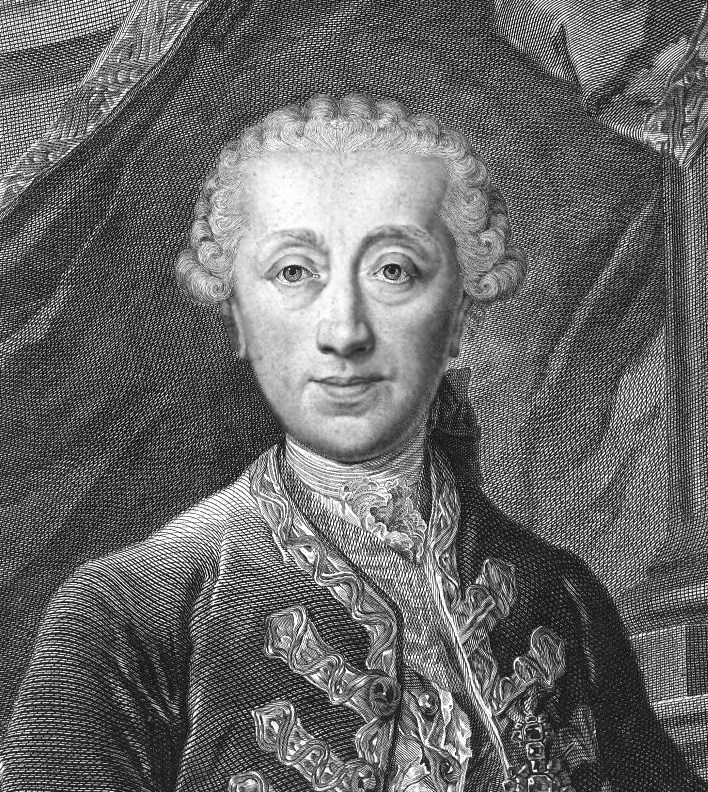
Wenzel Anton von Kaunitz

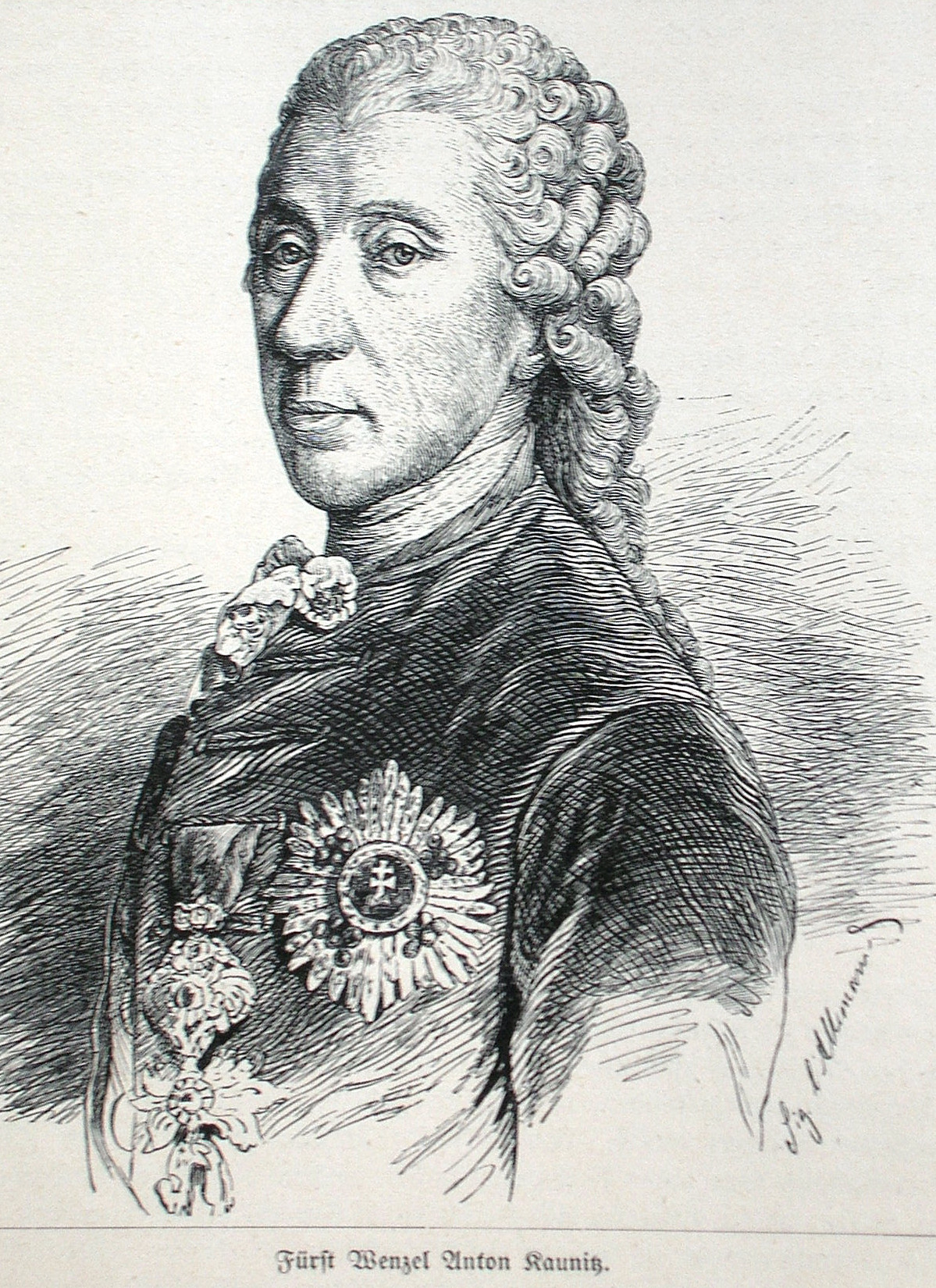
Wenzel Anton von Kaunitz

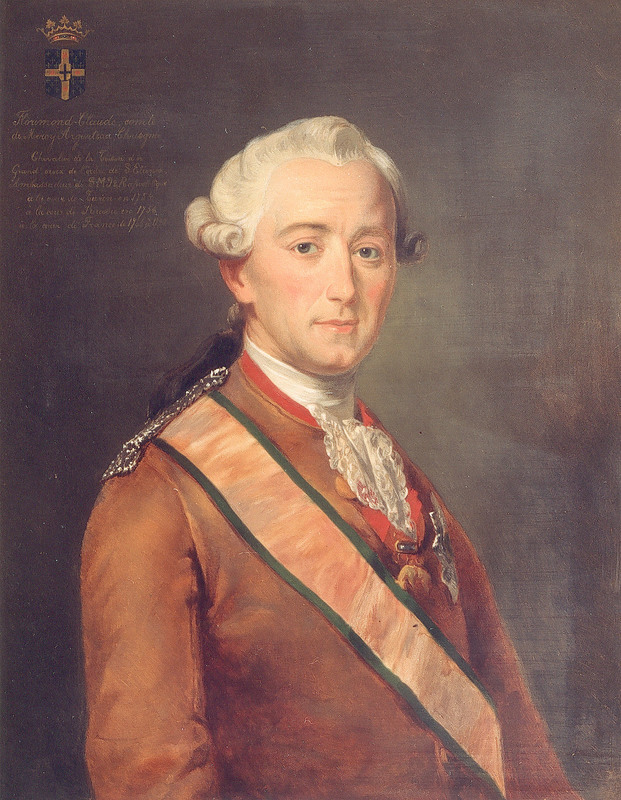
Florimont-Claude Mercy-Argenteau

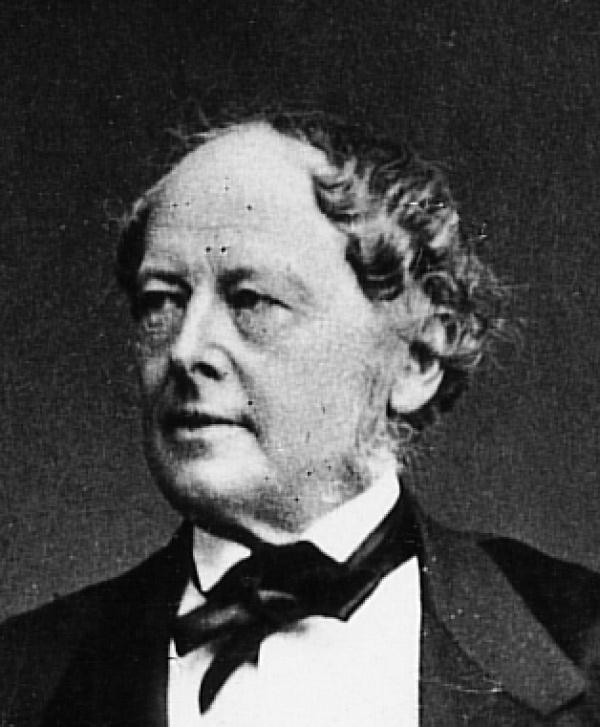
Friedrich Ferdinand von Beust

Envoys from the court of Vienna appeared as early as the 16th century, but France and the nascent Habsburg Empire were often decidedly hostile to one another, as the end of the Italian Wars showed that the two states had conflicting hegemonic interests. There was a permanent diplomatic mission in Paris from 1679.

== Heads of Mission ==
=== Habsburg Envoy ===
- 1680–1682: Heinrich Franz von Mansfeld
- 1683-1684?: Johann von Althann
- 1685-1685: Johann Friedrich von Seilern
- 1685–1688: Wenzel Ferdinand Popel von Lobkowitz
- 1688-1699: Vacant (Nine Years' War)
- 1699–1701: Philipp Ludwig Wenzel von Sinzendorf
- 1701-1713: Vacant (War of the Spanish Succession)
- 1713–1714: Prinz Eugene of Savoy (Peace negotiations)
- 1714-1714: Johann Friedrich von Seilern (2nd term)
- 1714-1714: Johann Peter Goëss
- 1715–1716: Johann Christoph Pentenriedter
- 1717–1719: Dominik von Königsegg-Rothenfels
- 1719–1719: Marcus de Fonseca
- 1719–1728: Johann Christoph von Pentenriedter (2nd term)
- 1729–1732: Stephan Wilhelm Kinsky
- 1732–1733: Ignaz Johann Wasner, (Resident)
- 1733-1736: Vacant (War of the Polish Succession)
- 1736–1737: Leopold von Schmerling
- 1737–1741: Joseph Wenzel I, Prince of Liechtenstein
- 1741–1744: Paul Gundel
- 1744-1749: : Vacant (War of the Austrian Succession)
- 1749–1750: Johann von Mareschall
- 1750–1752: Wenzel Anton, Prince of Kaunitz-Rietberg (attaché: Ludwig von Zinzendorf)
- 1752–1753: Johann von Mareschall (2nd term)
- 1753–1766: Georg Adam, Prince of Starhemberg
- 1766–1790: Florimond Claude, Comte de Mercy-Argenteau
- 1790–1792: Franz Paul von Blumendorf (Chargé d’affaires)
- 1792–1801: Vacant (Wars of the French Revolution)
- 1801–1805: Philipp von Cobenzl

=== Austrian Empire Ambassador ===
- 1805–1806: Vacant
- 1806–1806: Peter von Floret (Chargé d'affaires)
- 1806–1809: Klemens Wenzel von Metternich
- 1809–1813: Karl Philipp zu Schwarzenberg
- 1813–1814: Vacant
- 1814–1814: Ludwig Philipp von Bombelles (Chargé d'affaires)
- 1814–1825: Karl von Vincent
- 1825–1826: Friedrich Binder von Krieglstein (Chargé d'affaires)
- 1826–1848: Anton von Apponyi
- 1848–1849: Ludwig von Thom (Chargé d'affaires)
- 1849–1859: Alexander von Hübner
- 1859–1867: Richard von Metternich

=== Austro-Hungarian Ambassador ===
- 1867–1871: Richard von Metternich
- 1871–1876: Rudolf, Count of Apponyi
- 1876–1878: Felix von Wimpffen
- 1878–1882: Friedrich Ferdinand von Beust
- 1882–1882: Felix von Wimpffen (2nd term)
- 1883–1894: Ladislaus Hoyos-Sprinzenstein
- 1894–1903: Anton von Wolkenstein-Trostburg
- 1903–1910: Rudolf von Khevenhüller-Metsch
- 1911–1914: Count Nikolaus Szécsen von Temerin

== See also ==
- List of diplomatic missions of Austria-Hungary
