= List of foreign ministers of Austria-Hungary =

This is a list of foreign ministers (German: Außenminister) of the Habsburg monarchy, of the Austrian Empire, and of Austria-Hungary from 1720 to 1918.

== Ministers of foreign affairs ==
=== Habsburg monarchy (1720–1805) ===
From 1664/69 the Privy Conference (Geheime Konferenz), a committee of the Imperial Privy Council (Geheimer Rat), provided advice to Emperor Leopold I whereby the Austrian Court Chancellor, responsible for the Habsburg 'Hereditary Lands', served as rapporteur and thereby gained increasing influence. The Habsburg diplomatic service was re-organised, when Emperor Charles VI by resolution of 1720 declared Court Chancellor Philipp Ludwig Wenzel von Sinzendorf responsible for foreign policy issues. Upon Sinzendorf's death in February 1742, Archduchess Maria Theresa finally separated the central Habsburg State Chancellery responsible of Foreign Affairs from the domestic Austrian Court Chancellery.

Portrait	Name (Birth–Death)	Took office	Left office	Duration
	Philipp Ludwig von Sinzendorf (1671–1742)	26 March 1720	8 February 1742 †	21 years, 317 days
	Anton Corfiz Ulfeldt (1699–1769)	14 February 1742	13 May 1753	11 years, 88 days
	Wenzel Kaunitz (1711–1794)	13 May 1753	19 August 1792	39 years, 98 days
	Philipp von Cobenzl (1741–1810)	19 August 1792	27 March 1793	220 days
	Johann Amadeus von Thugut (1736–1818)	27 March 1793	28 September 1800	7 years, 185 days
	Ferdinand von Trauttmansdorff (1749–1827)	28 September 1800	18 September 1801	355 days
	Ludwig von Cobenzl (1753–1809)	18 September 1801	25 December 1805	4 years, 98 days

=== Austrian Empire (1805–1867) ===
Portrait	Name (Birth–Death)	Took office	Left office	Duration
	Philipp Stadion (1763–1824)	25 December 1805	4 October 1809	3 years, 283 days
	Klemens von Metternich (1773–1859)	8 October 1809	13 March 1848	38 years, 157 days
	Karl Ficquelmont (1777–1857)	18 March 1848	4 May 1848	47 days
	Johann Wessenberg (1773–1858)	8 May 1848	21 November 1848	197 days
	Felix Schwarzenberg (1800–1852)	21 November 1848	5 April 1852 †	4 years, 135 days
	Karl Buol (1797–1865)	11 April 1852	17 May 1859	7 years, 36 days
	Bernhard Rechberg (1806–1899)	17 May 1859	27 October 1864	5 years, 163 days
	Alexander Mensdorff (1813–1871)	27 October 1864	30 October 1866	2 years, 3 days
	Ferdinand Beust (1809–1886)	30 October 1866	30 December 1867	1 year, 61 days

=== Imperial and Royal House of Austria-Hungary (1867–1918) ===
Portrait	Name (Birth–Death)	Took office	Left office	Duration
	Ferdinand Beust (1809–1886)	30 December 1867	8 November 1871	3 years, 313 days
	Gyula Andrássy the Elder (1823–1890)	14 November 1871	8 October 1879	7 years, 328 days
	Heinrich Haymerle (1828–1881)	8 October 1879	10 October 1881 †	2 years, 2 days
	Gustav Kálnoky (1832–1898)	20 November 1881	2 May 1895	13 years, 163 days
	Agenor Gołuchowski (1849–1921)	16 May 1895	24 October 1906	11 years, 161 days
	Alois Aehrenthal (1854–1912)	24 October 1906	17 February 1912 †	5 years, 116 days
	Leopold Berchtold (1863–1942)	17 February 1912	13 January 1915	2 years, 330 days
	Stephan Burián (1851–1922)	13 January 1915	22 December 1916	1 year, 344 days
	Ottokar Czernin (1872–1932)	22 December 1916	16 April 1918	1 year, 115 days
	Stephan Burián (1851–1922)	16 April 1918	24 October 1918	191 days
	Gyula Andrássy the Younger (1860–1929)	24 October 1918	2 November 1918	9 days

== See also ==
- Foreign Ministry of Austria-Hungary
- Austro-Hungarian Foreign Service
- List of diplomatic missions of Austria-Hungary

== Bibliography ==
- Erwin Matsch, Der Auswärtige Dienst von Österreich-Ungarn 1720-1920, Vienna, Böhlau, 1986.
- —, Geschichte des Auswärtigen Dienstes von Österreich-Ungarn 1720-1920, Vienna, Böhlau, 1980.
