= Baron Julius von Szilassy =

Austro-Hungarian diplomat

Julius Freiherr Szilassy von Szilas und Pilis
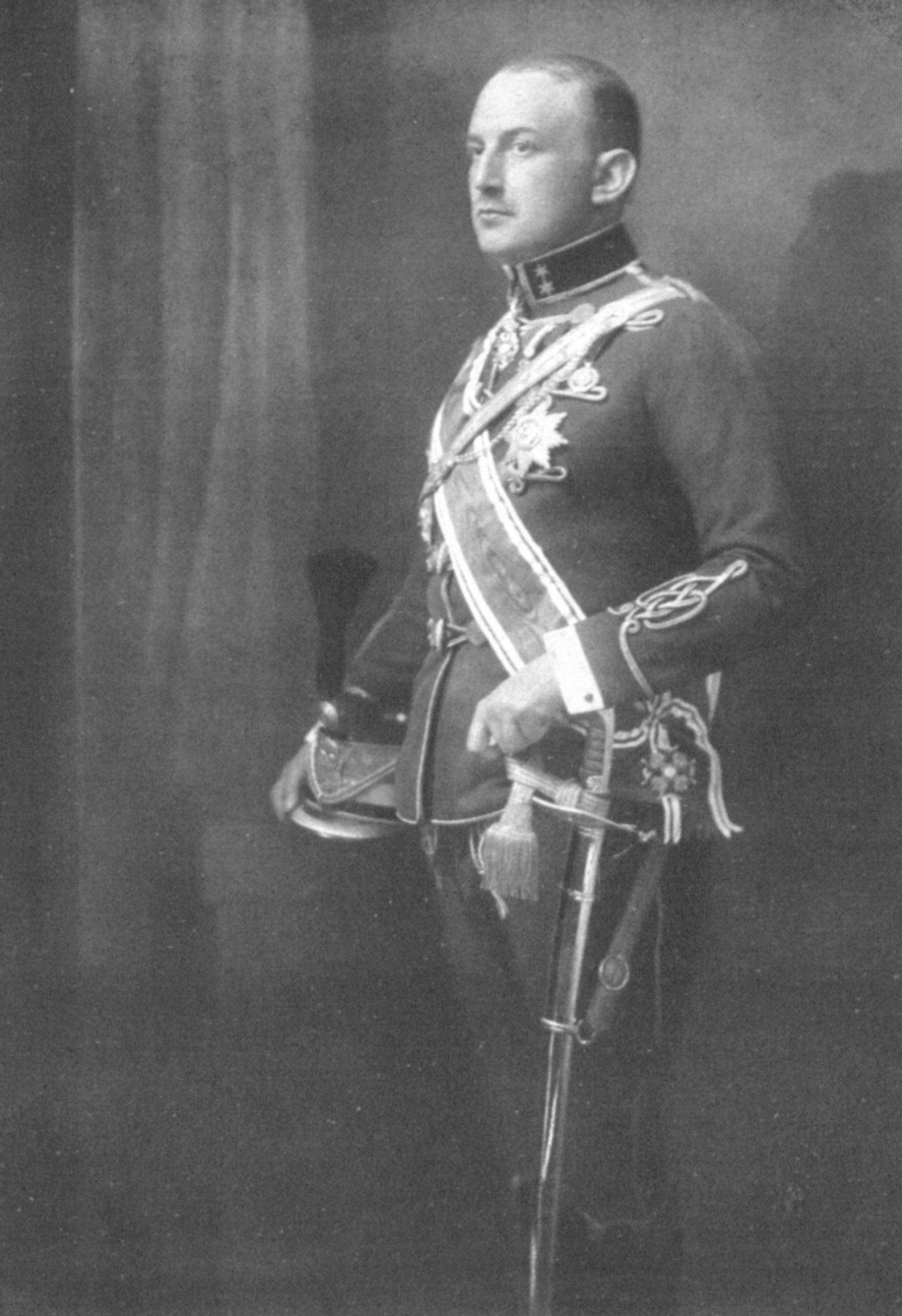
- c. 1914

Austro-Hungarian Minister to Greece
- In office 7 November 1913 – 21 November 1916
- Preceded by: Karl Freiherr von Braun
- Succeeded by: None

Personal details
- Born: 21 August 1870 Bex, Switzerland
- Died: 1935 Nice, France
- Spouse(s): Louise-May, née Hecker

Julius (Hope Joseph) (from 1918, Freiherr) Szilassy von Szilas und Pilis (Hungarian: Gyula báró Szilassy de Szilas et Pilis) (21 August 1870 – 1935) was an Austro-Hungarian diplomat of Hungarian origin serving in various posts including as an envoy to Greece during World War I and, for many years, as Secretary of the Austro-Hungary Legation to Washington, D.C.

== Life ==
Jules Hope Joseph de Szilassy (Jules Szilassy in French, Julius von Szilassy in German, Szilassy Gyula junior in Hungarian) was born August 21, 1870, in Bex, Switzerland, and died June 7, 1935, in Nizza, France. He was the son of Julius von Szilazzy and Laura Correvon (adopted daughter and heiress of Elisabeth Hope, daughter of Hon. Charles Hope). He was educated in Bex and College de Geneve, in Switzerland, after that at Harrow between 1885 and 1888, at the universities in Budapest and Munich. He entered the Austro-Hungarian foreign service in 1894. He absolved the diplomatic examens in 1895. He served subsequently in a number of diplomatic missions abroad. In 1898, he married Louise-May Hecker (1874–1959), daughter of Frank J. Hecker, in Detroit. They had one child, Charles Henry de Szilassy who was born December 15, 1899, Detroit, Wayne Michigan. He died in September 1967 in Grosse Pointe, Wayne. Louise-May Szilassy-Hecker asked for divorce in 1905. she later married Theodore Gould Fletcher (1871–1921).

In 1907, Szilassy was a member of the Austro-Hungarian delegation to the Second Hague Peace Conference and was appointed the following year to serve as counsellor in St. Petersburg before returning to Vienna in 1912. In November 1913, he was appointed to serve as Austro-Hungarian Minister at Athens and had to manage war-time complexities in Greece. In November 1916, he was expelled by the Entente from Athens.

After his return to Vienna at the end of 1916, he served for a year in the Ballhausplatz before being dispatched to Constantinople (now Istanbul) as counsellor in October 1917, where he remained until the end of the war. There had been several rumours of his appointment as Imperial Foreign Minister in 1917/1918 but his ties to Károlyi had prevented this. On 1 May 1918, he was created a baron.

As one of few professional diplomats who remained in service following the fall of the Habsburg Empire in 1918, he served as the first Hungarian envoy to Switzerland from February to April 1919. After Béla Kun's revolution, he went into exile but did not return to Hungary during the Horthy years and devoted his remaining life to write several books on diplomacy as well as his memoirs. The latter are unusually frank, in particular the criticism of Count von Berchtold, the Imperial Foreign Minister from 1912 to 1915.

Baron Szilassy died in 1935.

== Works ==
- L'Empire du travail. La Vie aux États-Unis. (Anadoli) Paris, Plon, 1905.
- Jegyzetek Japánról I.(Notes on Japan I.) (Anadoli) In: Budapesti Szemle (Budapest Review) Vol. 147. (1911) No. 417. 344–362. p.
- Jegyzetek Japánról II. (Notes on Japan II.) (Anadoli) In: Budapesti Szemle (Budapest Review) Vol. 148. (1911) No. 418. 8–31. p.
- Angol levelek I. (English Letters I.) (Anadoli) In: Budapesti Szemle (Budapest Review) Vol. 170. (1917) No. 485. 218–229. p.
- Angol levelek II. (English Letters II.) (Anadoli) In: Budapesti Szemle (Budapest Review) Vol. 170. (1917) No. 486. 408–436. p.
- Impressions sur la situation internationale de la Hongrie et la politique à suivre. Memorandum for Count Michel Károlyi. Bern, February 9, 1919. In: Correspondance of Count Michel Károlyi Vol. 1. 1905–1920. Ed. Litván, György. Budapest, 1978. 418–423. p.
- Der Untergang der Donau-Monarchie. Diplomatische Erinnerungen, Berlin, E. Berger, 1921.
- Wahrheiten und Legenden. Gedanken über das, was wir suchen, Berlin, Enck, 1921. 128 p.
- Manuel pratique de diplomatie moderne, Lausanne–Genève, 1925.
- Traité pratique de diplomatie moderne, Paris, Payot, 1928.
- Le procès de la Hongrie. Les relations franco–hongroises devant l'histoire, Paris, F. Alcan, 1932.

Diplomatic posts
Preceded by Karl Freiherr von Braun	Austro-Hungarian Minister to Greece; 1913–1916	Succeeded by None
