= Johann von Pallavicini =

Austro-Hungarian nobleman and diplomat

Marquess Johann von Pallavicini
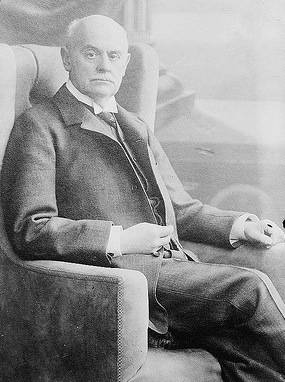
- Photo of Markgraf Johann von Pallavicini (c. 1910)

Austro-Hungarian Minister to Romania
- In office 26 January 1899 – 5 October 1906
- Preceded by: Alois Freiherr Lexa von Aehrenthal
- Succeeded by: Johann Prinz von Schönburg-Hartenstein

Austro-Hungarian Ambassador to Turkey
- In office 5 October 1906 – 11 November 1918
- Preceded by: Heinrich Freiherr von Calice
- Succeeded by: None

Member of the House of Magnates
- In office 1927 – 4 May 1941

Personal details
- Born: 18 March 1848 Padua, Austrian Empire (from 1866, Italy)
- Died: 4 May 1941 (aged 93) Pusztaradvány, Hungary
- Spouse(s): Georgina, née Reade Crowe (1862–1936)

Marquess Johann von Pallavicini (German: Johann Markgraf von Pallavicini; Hungarian: Pallavicini János őrgróf; 18 March 1848 – 4 May 1941) was an Austro-Hungarian nobleman and diplomat, notably serving as ambassador at the Sublime Porte during World War I.

== Life ==
He was born in Padua on 18 March 1848 into the ancient noble Pallavicini family. He entered the Austro-Hungarian foreign service after studies in Ödenburg (now Sopron) and Vienna. In 1871, he was dispatched as attaché to Berlin, in 1878 to Paris and in 1880 to London. In 1887, he was an embassy secretary in Belgrade and in 1894 a counselor in Munich before being sent to St. Petersburg the same year. He was appointed minister at Bucharest in January 1899.

On 5 October 1906, Marquis von Pallavicini was appointed ambassador at Constantinople (now Istanbul) by Emperor Franz Joseph I. In 1911, he temporarily acted as Foreign Minister during the illness of Count Lexa von Aehrenthal. Marquis von Pallavicini was widely regarded as one of the most respected diplomats of the Dual Monarchy and was in difference to Count Lexa von Aehrenthal and many of the younger diplomats in Ballhausplatz against the annexation of Bosnia in 1908.

During World War I, he successfully worked for bringing the Ottoman Empire into the war on the side of the Central Powers. Due to his long tenure and being the dean of the diplomatic corps in Constantinople, he was considered to wield a large influence over events in the Ottoman Empire. However, his role with regard to the Armenian Question has been debated by historians over the years and criticism has been raised that he did not protest loudly enough. The reports that he sent to Vienna clearly show that he was aware of the nature of the Ottoman initiative and that it involved a "centrally planned and organised extermination". Already in June 1915, he wrote to Vienna that "the Armenian population ... is not only being subjected to the greatest misery but also to a total extermination (einer gänzlichen Ausrottung)". To his defence, however, records also show that he did protest but to no avail.

In April 1917, Markgraf von Pallavicini politely declined Emperor Karl I's offer of becoming Foreign Minister.

He was bestowed with the Grand Cross of the Order of Saint Stephen in 1917 and appointed a member of the Upper House in 1927.

Marquis von Pallavicini died in Pusztaradvány on 4 May 1941.

== Notes ==
Regarding personal names: Markgraf is a title, translated as Marquess, not a first or middle name. The female form is Markgräfin.

== See also ==
- Witnesses and testimonies of the Armenian genocide

Diplomatic posts
Preceded by Alois Freiherr Lexa von Aehrenthal	Austro-Hungarian Minister to Romania; 1899–1906	Succeeded by Johann Prinz von Schönburg-Hartenstein
Preceded by Heinrich Freiherr von Calice	Austro-Hungarian Ambassador to the Ottoman Empire; 1906–1918	Succeeded by None
