= Alois Lexa von Aehrenthal =

Austro-Hungarian diplomat

Graf Alois Lexa von Aehrenthal
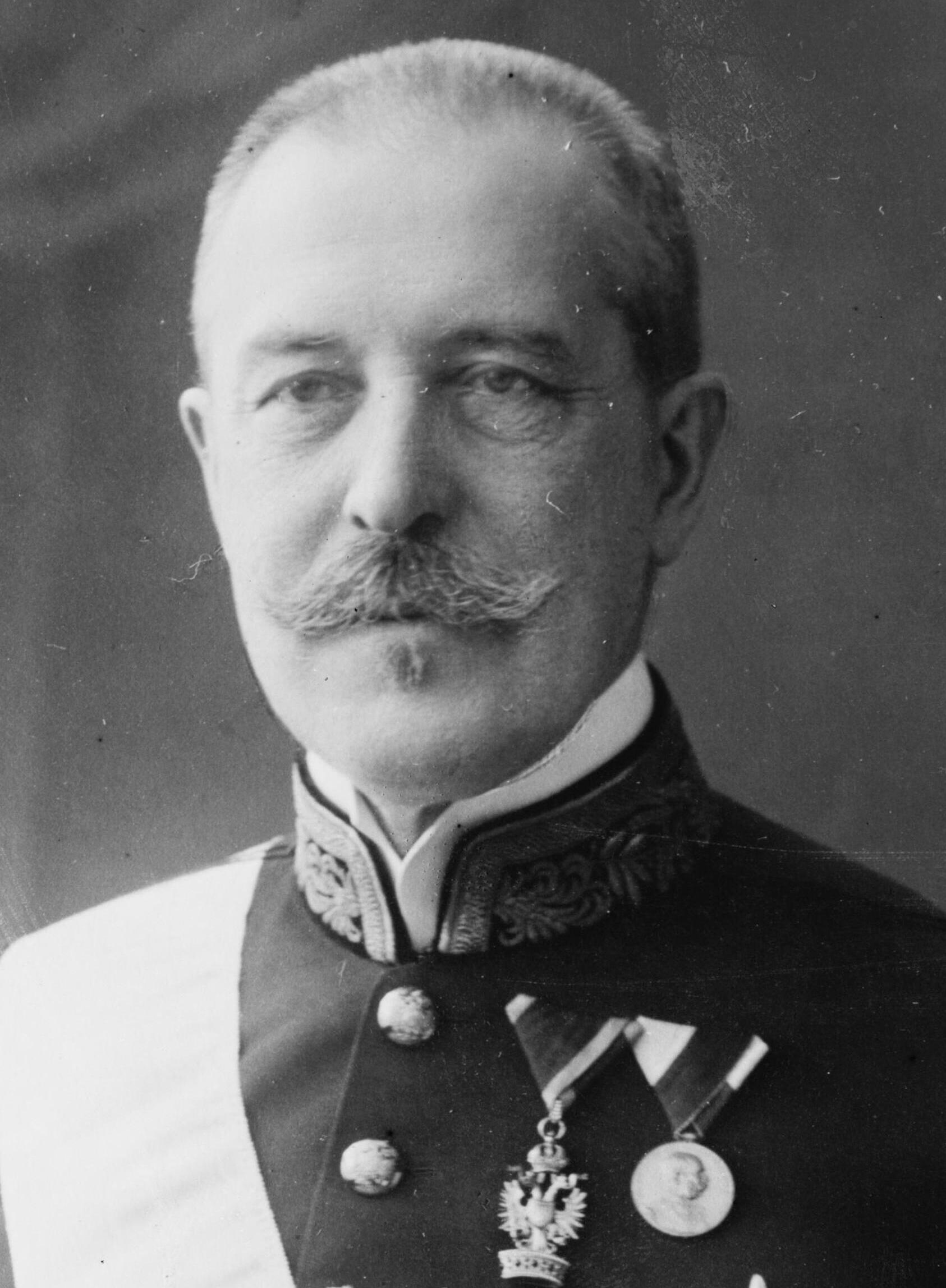
- Portrait of Aehrenthal (1907)

Foreign Minister of Austria-Hungary
- In office 24 October 1906 – 17 February 1912
- Monarch: Franz Joseph I
- Preceded by: Agenor Maria Gołuchowski
- Succeeded by: Leopold Berchtold

Personal details
- Born: 27 September 1854 Groß Skal (Hrubá Skála), Bohemia, Austrian Empire
- Died: 17 February 1912 (aged 57) Vienna, Austria-Hungary
- Profession: Diplomat

Alois Leopold Johann Baptist Graf Lexa von Aehrenthal (27 September 1854 – 17 February 1912) was a diplomat of the Austro-Hungarian Empire. According to his biographer Solomon Wank, he exuded a strong monarchical-conservative outlook, loyalty to the Empire, and optimism regarding its ability to survive and flourish in the early-20th century. He became best known for promoting an energetic Austro-Hungarian foreign-policy in the Balkans, seeking cooperation with Russia and approval of Germany for actions that angered the South Slav element in the Balkans.

As Imperial Foreign Minister between 1906 and 1912, Aehrenthal formulated and executed the Austro-Hungarian annexation of Bosnia and Herzegovina and their integration in 1908 into the Austro-Hungarian Empire. With the annexation he sought to permanently block in the Balkan south of the empire the emergence there of inter- and intra-ethnic nationalisms amongst the multiplicity of peoples on the basis of their shared religious beliefs and ethnic affiliations. His actions precipitated the Bosnian Crisis because he sought to achieve his objectives by negotiation of Russian acceptance of the annexation in exchange for Austro-Hungarian support for greater Russian access from the Black Sea to the Mediterranean through the Straits of the Dardanelles (at the expense of the Ottoman Empire). Aehrenthal expected that Britain and France would accept this deal since they had recently become aligned with Russia.

Seeking to limit objections in Russia to any support for the annexation, Aehrenthal began secret negotiations with Russian foreign minister Alexander Izvolsky before Vienna made its move. The annexation ultimately damaged Austro-Russian collaboration on settling Balkan questions. It also stirred chauvinist popular emotion in Russia, which felt humiliated in a sphere of vital interest to it.

== Origins ==
Born at Groß Skal Castle in Bohemia (Czech: Hrubá Skála, Czech Republic), he was the second-born son of Baron (Freiherr) Johann Lexa von Aehrenthal (1817–1898), a large-scale landowner in Groß Skal and Doxan, and his wife Marie, née Countess Thun und Hohenstein. His father was a powerful leader of the Constitutionally Loyal Large Landowners party in Bohemia. His great-grandfather Johann Anton Lexa (1733–1824), from a rural background in Kralovice, had founded an insurance company in Prague and entered the untitled nobility in 1790.

His family owned more than thirteen thousand acres.

There were however, inaccurate rumors about his ancestors spread by his enemies that he was in reality of a commercial-bourgeois and Jewish origin: namely that he was the grandson of a certain Lexa, a Jewish grain merchant of Prague, who had acquired great wealth through speculation and trade and was thence ennobled under the name of Aehrenthal (literally "valley of grain") in allusion to his calling.

== Character ==
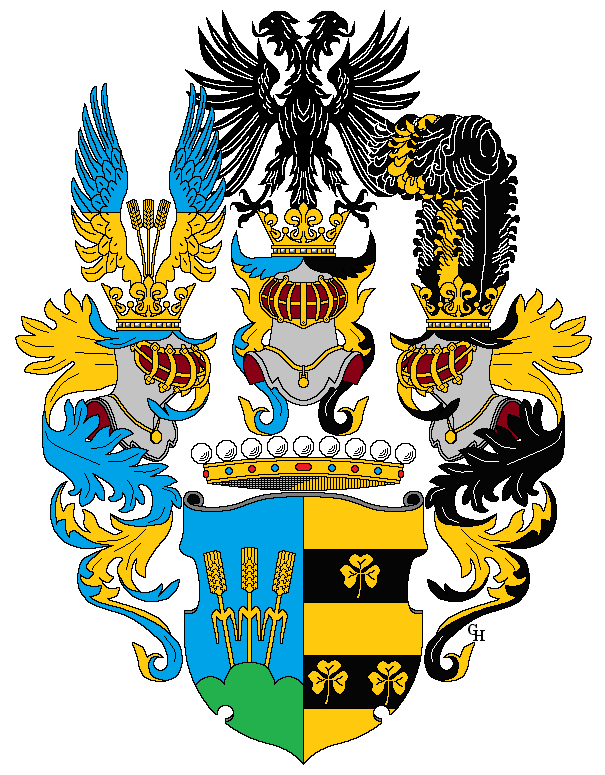
Coat of arms of Aehrenthal

"His diplomacy" wrote Olof Hoijer, was "composed more of hard arrogance and dissolvent intrigue than of prudent reserve and ingratiating souplesse; it was a mixture of pretention and subtlety, of force and ruse, of realism and cynicism: his readiness to cheat, to circumvent, to outwit hid a harsh and ruthless will." Asquith regarded him as the cleverest and perhaps the least scrupulous of Austrian statesmen. He undoubtedly showed himself to be an able and ambitious diplomat, a cool negotiator, a wide-awake observer, a patient listener, a discreet talker endowed with great outward calm but with a lively and dominating imagination more passionate than clear sighted.

== Career ==
With no great prospects of inheritance, Aehrenthal studied law and politics at the University of Bonn and the Charles University in Prague. He began his career in the diplomatic service of the empire, as attaché in Paris under Count Friedrich Ferdinand von Beust in 1877. He went in 1878 in the same capacity to Saint Petersburg, Russia, and from 1883 to 1888 he worked at the Foreign Ministry in Vienna under Count Gustav Kálnoky, with whom he formed close relations. In 1888, he was sent as councillor of embassy to Saint Petersburg, where he exercised considerable influence with the ambassador, Count Wolkenstein.

Recalled in 1894 to service in the Foreign Ministry, he undertook important duties, and in the following year went to Bucharest as Minister to Romania. Here he succeeded in strengthening the relations between the courts of Vienna and Bucharest by renewing the secret alliance which it had signed in 1883. In 1899, he became ambassador in Saint Petersburg, where he remained until his appointment as Foreign Minister in October 1906. Aehrenthal at this time thought that it was essential for Austria-Hungary to come to an agreement with Russia. In this sense he endeavoured to continue the negotiations successfully begun by his predecessor, Prince Franz von und zu Liechtenstein, for the bridging over of the differences on Balkan questions between Vienna and Saint Petersburg, in order to create a basis for a permanent friendly relation between Austria-Hungary and Russia.

He played a principal part in concluding the Mürzsteg Agreement of 1903. During the Russo-Japanese War he took a strong line in favour of a friendly attitude towards Russia. In October 1906, he replaced Count Goluchowski as minister of foreign affairs.

Soon after taking office, he reformed the admission examination so future diplomats would have a better understanding of the importance of trade and economics on foreign policy and appointed "commercial advisers" to all important consular offices.

He at first maintained the views which he had professed as ambassador. He was determined to preserve the interests of Austria-Hungary in the Balkans, but also showed himself prepared to meet the Russian wishes in the Dardanelles question. However, in the course of the Bosnian Crisis, he abandoned the idea of a friendly accommodation with Russia.

=== Bosnian Crisis of 1908-1909 ===
The principal players in the Bosnian Crisis of 1908-09 were the foreign ministers of Austria-Hungary and Russia, Aehrenthal and Alexander Izvolsky. Both were motivated by political ambition; the first would emerge successful, and the latter would be broken by the crisis. Along the way, they would drag Europe to the brink of war in 1909. They would also divide Europe into the two armed camps that would indeed go to war in July 1914.

Under the Treaty of Berlin, The Ottomans controlled the Dardanelles strait connecting the Mediterranean and the Black Sea. The treaty prohibited the passage of any warships from any country into or out of the Black Sea. This treaty bottled up a major portion of the Russian Black Sea Fleet, making it useless in the Russo-Japanese War of 1904-1905 when it was urgently needed. Izvolsky wanted this changed to allow the passage of Russian ships through the straits. Aehrenthal wanted full control of Bosnia-Herzegovina. Austria-Hungary had administered the provinces since 1878 but the Ottoman Empire retained nominal sovereignty. Aehrenthal concocted a grand diplomatic deal that proposed major benefits for both sides. Austria-Hungary would gain full possession of Bosnia with Russian approval. The Ottoman Empire would regain full control of the Austrian occupied territory known as the Sanjak of Novi Pazar, plus financial compensation. Russia would get the right of passage for its warships through the Straits. Serbia would get zero. Before approaching the Russians, Aehrenthal met with Austrian and Hungarian officials and won the approval of Emperor Franz Joseph I. On September 15–16 Aehrenthal and Izvolsky held a secret meeting. No record was kept—and afterwards both sides remembered it very differently. Aehrenthal assumed he had full Russian approval for his scheme, but without planned dates. Izvolsky assumed he would be informed before any actual move happened. Aehrenthal vaguely informed all the major countries but gave no details. The world was astonished on October 6, 1908, when a press release in Vienna announced that Bosnia was fully annexed. Inside Austria-Hungary there was general approval except in Czech areas—that minority strongly felt its demands had been deliberately ignored.

Aehrenthal had expected wide European approval and instead he faced a hostile volcanic eruption from every direction. Izvolsky vehemently denounced the treachery and demanded an international conference on Bosnia. After decades of low level activity, pan-Slavic forces inside Russia suddenly mobilized in opposition. Mass demonstrations broke out across the continent. Rome took advantage of the situation by reversing its friendship with Vienna. Berlin officials were surprised and appalled. The British were especially angry, denouncing the violation of an international agreement signed by both Austria-Hungary and Britain. France denounced the scheme. The Ottoman Empire was surprised by the unexpected development, but was quieted by the cash payment. By far the angriest reaction came from Serbia, which called for revenge, and began setting up secret guerrilla bands, plotting insurrection in Bosnia. All across Europe the chief blame was placed on Berlin, not Vienna. Europeans feared the powerful Imperial German Army and took the episode as proof of its expansionist intentions. Berlin now realized it stood alone, with Austria-Hungary its only friend. It therefore decided it would firmly support Austria-Hungary despite doubts about the wisdom of annexing Bosnia. Berlin explicitly warned Saint Petersburg that continued demands for an international conference constituted a hostile action that would increase the risk of war with Germany. Coupled with Austrian threats to publish details of the secret meeting between Aehrenthal and Izvolsky, Russia backed down. Thanks to the German intervention, Austria-Hungary scored a complete short-term diplomatic success in taking control of Bosnia. in the long run however, Germany and Austria both made many too enemies, as the battle lines of World War I started to harden.

Aehrenthal had started with the assumption that the Slavic minorities could never come together, and the Balkan League would never accomplish any damage to Austria-Hungary. He turned down an Ottoman proposal for an alliance that would include Austria-Hungary, Turkey and Romania. However his policies alienated the Bulgarians, who turned instead to Russia and Serbia. Although Austria-Hungary had no intention to embark on additional expansion to the south, Aehrenthal encouraged speculation to that effect, expecting it would paralyze the Balkan states. Instead, it incited them to feverish activity to create a defensive block to stop Austria-Hungary. A series of grave miscalculations at the highest level thus significantly strengthened Austria-Hungary's enemies.

=== Pan-Slavism ===
For Aehrenthal, a German and a staunch monarchist, there was a direct threat in the Pan-Slav emergent nationalism of the kind that a consolidated Yugo (south) Slav Confederation led by Serbia represented. The gradual consolidation of the Yugo-Slavs (in the name of the 'new centuries' idea of national self-determination for all ethnic/racial/religious groups) led by Serbia was a deadly threat to Aehrenthal's Austria-Hungary. For Aehrenthal, Moravia, Bohemia, and Silesia were the crown lands of his Ost-Mark German nobility, which ruled over a host of emergent Slav and Pan-Slav ethnicities: Polish, Czech, Ruthenian, Slovak, and Ukrainian. In Serbia's consolidation of Bosnia-Herzegovina into herself, there was the clear roadmap to the dissolution of most of the Austro-Hungarian Empire. More importantly, this Pan-Slav self-determinant nationalism pointed the way to the loss of the defendable military, political, and economic boundaries of the empire. Aehrenthal's Hungarian noble half saw an equally strong threat with the loss of Hungary's historic Slavic provinces should Pan-Slavist ideology take root. It would equally threaten its military security and economic future. Aehrenthal moved quickly, faster than Izvolsky. He acted on 3 October 1908 under the premise that Austria-Hungary was taking control of Bosnia-Herzegovina so that the people there could enjoy the benefits of the empire as a reward for economic advancement since first being administered back in 1878. A seething Serbia could hardly believe this action and demanded Russian intervention. This left Izvolsky holding the bag. He announced his plans for the free passage of Russian warships though the Turkish straits but was shot down by every other signatory to the treaty, especially Britain. The British said they would consider opening up the straits to all warships but would not limit it to Russian ships alone. This is hardly what Izvolsky had in mind since this had the potential of letting belligerent ships into the Black Sea. Germany at first viewed the whole tangle with disdain, taking the Turkish side. The Kaiser had been working on strengthening relations with Turkey and, now with the chance of Ottoman recovery, he wished to stay this course.

As the crisis continued, the Kaiser was forced from the diplomatic scene by the Daily Telegraph Affair and no longer was a major decision maker. Events reached a fever pitch when, in early November, the Royal Serbian Army mobilized. Germany now took the Austro-Hungarian side stating it would stick by its ally. Russia, wishing to support Serbia, but not really ready for war with Germany and Austria-Hungary was forced to back away when the Austrians threatened to publish the details of the agreement between Aehrenthal and Izvolsky and Germany sent a vaguely-worded threat to Izvolsky, stating they would "let things take their course." The fact that she had betrayed her Slav ally beforehand was not a fact that Russia wished widely publicized. Izvolsky remained at his post for three more years but his reputation was ruined beyond repair. The Russians backed down and urged Serbia to do likewise, which she did and declared publicly that the annexation was none of her business. War was averted for the time being, but the results were a bitter Russia and an enraged Serbia. Russia vowed, if ever confronted in this manner again, that she would not back down - a vow that would be kept in a few years.

== Family ==
In 1902, Aehrenthal married Pauline, Countess Széchényi de Sárvár-Felsővidék (1871–1945) and had:

- Countess Caroline Marie Antoinette Henriette Luise Lexa von Aehrenthal (b. 1904), never married
- Count Johann Maria Felix Anton Carl Lexa von Aehrenthal (1905–1972), married Countess Ernestine von Harrach zu Rohrau und Thannhausen (1903–1990) and had issue
- Countess Elisabeth Maria Josefa Antoinette Aloysia Lexa von Aehrenthal (1909–1971), married Count Josef Zdenko von Thun und Hohenstein (1907–1976), had no issue

== Death ==
In 1912, Count Lexa von Aehrenthal suddenly died of leukemia.

== Honours ==
National orders and decorations

- Knight of the Iron Crown, 3rd Class, 1882
- Grand Cross of the Order of Franz Joseph, 1896
- Jubilee Medal for Civil State Servants (1898)
- Grand Cross of the Imperial Order of Leopold, 1905
- Grand Cross of St. Stephen, 1908
- Court Jubilee Cross (1908)
- Marian Cross of the Teutonic Order
- Grand Cross of Honour and Devotion of the Austrian Order of Malta

Foreign orders and decorations

- Anhalt: Grand Cross of Albert the Bear
- Baden: Knight of the House Order of Fidelity, 1908
- Bavaria: Knight of St. Hubert
- Belgium: Grand Cordon of the Order of Leopold
- Bulgaria: Grand Cross of St. Alexander
- China: Order of the Double Dragon, Grade I Class III
- Greece: Grand Cross of the Redeemer
- Italy: Knight of the Annunciation, 30 September 1910
- Holy See: Grand Cross of the Order of Pope Pius IX
- Japan: Grand Cordon with Paulownia Flowers of the Order of the Rising Sun, 28 October 1910
- Lippe-Detmold: Cross of Honour of the House Order of Lippe, 1st Class
- Mecklenburg: Grand Cross of the Wendish Crown, with Golden Crown
- Oldenburg: Grand Cross of the Order of Duke Peter Friedrich Ludwig, with Collar
- Ottoman Empire:
  - Order of Osmanieh, 1st Class in Diamonds
  - Order of Glory, in Diamonds
- Prussia:
  - Knight of the Black Eagle, in Diamonds
  - Knight of the Prussian Crown, 2nd Class
- Romania:
  - Grand Cross of the Order of Carol I
  - Grand Cross of the Star of Romania
- Russia:
  - Knight of St. Andrew
  - Knight of St. Alexander Nevsky, in Diamonds
  - Knight of St. Anna, 2nd Class
  - Knight of St. Stanislaus, 1st Class
- Saxony: Knight of the Rue Crown
- Schaumburg-Lippe: Cross of Honour of the House Order of Schaumburg-Lippe, 1st Class
- Serbia: Grand Cross of the White Eagle
- Spain: Grand Cross of the Order of Charles III, with Collar, 20 October 1908
- Sweden-Norway:
  - Commander of the Polar Star, 2nd Class, 20 April 1885
  - Knight of the Seraphim, 5 December 1908
- United Kingdom: Honorary Grand Cross of the Royal Victorian Order, 15 August 1907
- Württemberg: Grand Cross of the Württemberg Crown

== Screen portrayal ==
Aehrenthal was depicted in "The Devil's Kiss," the third episode of Season Two of the BBC Two series, Vienna Blood, which centered on fictionalized events surrounding the Austro-Russian understanding on annexation of Bosnia-Herzegovina. He was played by actor Bernhard Schir.

He was depicted in Episode 9 "Dress Rehearsal" of the BBC television series Fall of Eagles. He was played by actor John Moffatt.

== See also ==
- Leopold Graf Berchtold

Diplomatic posts
Preceded by Graf Rudolf von Welsersheimb	Minister Plenipotentiary of His Imperial and Royal Apostolic Majesty the Emperor of Austria & King of Hungary to His Majesty the King of Romania; 4 November 1895–26 January 1899	Succeeded by Johann Markgraf von Pallavicini
Preceded by Franz, Prinz von und zu Liechtenstein	Ambassador of His Imperial and Royal Apostolic Majesty the Emperor of Austria & King of Hungary to His Imperial Majesty the Emperor and Autocrat of all the Russias; 26 January 1899–24 October 1906	Succeeded by Graf Leopold Berchtold von und zu Ungarschitz, Frättling und Püllütz
Government offices
Preceded by Count Goluchowski	Minister of Foreign Affairs; 1906–1912	Succeeded by Count Berchtold
