= Charles Hope (British Army officer) =

British politician

General Charles Hope (16 October 1768 – 1 July 1828) was a British Army officer and politician.

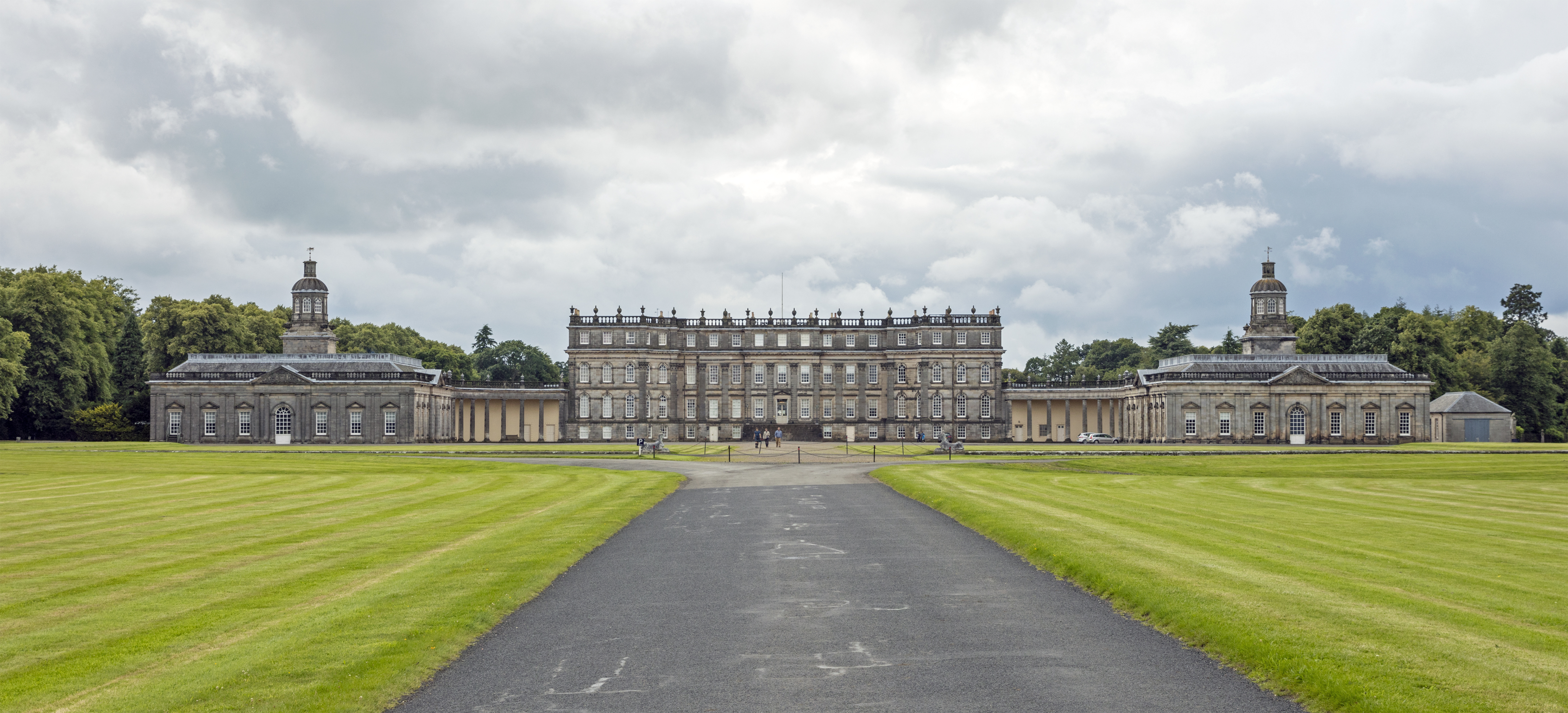
Hopetoun House, Scotland.

== Early life ==
He was the son of John Hope, 2nd Earl of Hopetoun by his third wife, Lady Elizabeth Leslie, daughter of Alexander Leslie, 5th Earl of Leven. Hope was raised alongside his many siblings at Hopetoun House.

Hope's younger full brother was Sir Alexander Hope, whose son married granddaughter and heiress of Sir Walter Scott.

== Political career ==
He was Member of Parliament (MP) for Dysart Burghs from 1790 to 1796.

On 12 May 1800, he was elected as MP for Haddingtonshire. He resigned from Parliament on 21 March 1816, accepting the stewardship of the Chiltern Hundreds.

== Family ==
Hope married Lady Louisa Anne Finch-Hatton on 30 April 1807, she was the eldest daughter of George Finch-Hatton and Lady Elizabeth Murray. Her brother was George Finch-Hatton, 10th Earl of Winchilsea. They had one daughter named Elisabeth Louisa Hope (1810-1868) born at Lady Louisa's parent's seat of Eastwell Park, Kent in January 1810.

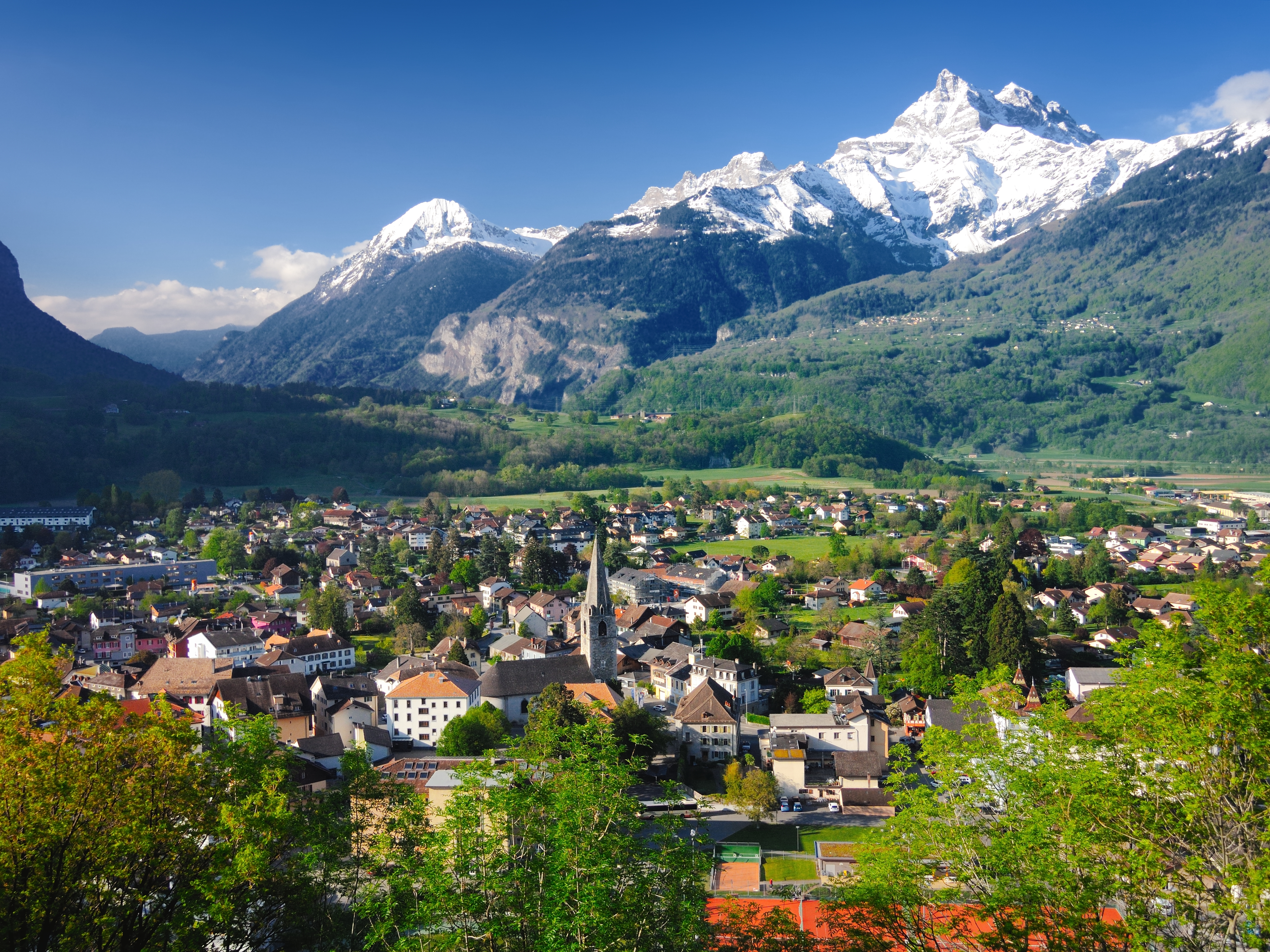
Bex, Switzerland

Charles Hope died on 1 July 1828. Later, his widow presented their daughter at the Queen's drawing room alongside their nieces in 1834. Afterwards His widow Lady Hope and their daughter Elisabeth travelled to Switzerland and settled there in 1834. They were the one who created the magnificent estate called Soressex, and in 1837, when Elisabeth Hope became the owner, there were only meadows, vines and a forest of chestnut trees. As they were wealthy, they built a two-storey mansion and below it a large glazed and heated greenhouse, housing orange trees, camellias and other exotic plants, the park (later called Szilassy Park) was landscaped in British style.

Elisabeth Hope would go on to marry her coachman Louis Billard, who was said to have saved her as a young woman in the face of a packed horse. They couldn't have children, instead adopting a young girl from Yverdon by the name of Laure Correvon. Laura in turn fell in love and married Jules de Szilassy, an aristocrat of Hungarian origin who had come to Switzerland to have his eyes treated. Jules de Szilassy was particularly generous with the commune of Bex, creating a foundation for the benefit of the poor. They have 8 children, their eldest son born in 1870 was named Baron Julius Hope von Szilassy.

Lady Louisa Hope died on 1 March 1875 outliving her husband and daughter. Szilassy Park later was donated to the state by Szilassy descendants.

Parliament of Great Britain
| Preceded by Sir Charles Preston, Bt | Member of Parliament for Dysart Burghs; 1790 – 1796 | Succeeded by Sir James St Clair-Erskine, Bt |
| Preceded by Hew Dalrymple-Hamilton | Member of Parliament for Haddingtonshire; May 1800 – December 1800 | Succeeded by Parliament of the United Kingdom |
Parliament of the United Kingdom
| Preceded by Parliament of Great Britain | Member of Parliament for Haddingtonshire; 1801 – 1816 | Succeeded by Sir James Grant-Suttie, Bt |
