= Ludwig von Flotow =

Austro-Hungarian statesman (1867–1948)

Foreign Minister of Austria-Hungary
- In office 3 November 1918 – 11 November 1918
- Monarch: Charles I
- Preceded by: Gyula Andrássy the Younger
- Succeeded by: none as Foreign Minister of Austria-Hungary (position liquidated), Victor Adler (as Foreign Minister of Austria), Mihály Károlyi (as Foreign Minister of Hungary)

Personal details
- Born: 17 November 1867 Vienna, Austrian Empire
- Died: 6 April 1948 (aged 80) Gmunden, Republic of Austria
- Party: Liberal Party, Constitution Party, KNEP, Christian National Party
- Profession: Politician

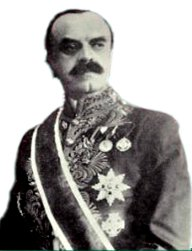
Ludwig von Flotow.

Ludwig von Flotow, after 1919 known simply as Ludwig Flotow (17 November 1867 in Vienna - 6 April 1948 in Gmunden) was an Austro-Hungarian statesman. He was the last Chairman of the Ministers' Council for Common Affairs, having served from 2 November 1918 until 11 November 1918. He resigned his office only in 1920, being loyal to Emperor Charles I of Austria.
