= Baron Heinrich Karl von Haymerle =

Austrian statesman

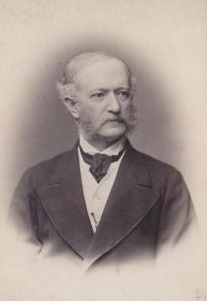
Baron Heinrich Karl von Haymerle (1878)

Baron Heinrich Karl von Haymerle (7 December 1828 – 10 October 1881) was an Austrian statesman born and educated in Vienna. He took part in the students' uprising in the revolution of 1848 and narrowly escaped execution. He served in the diplomatic corps at Athens, Dresden, and Frankfurt as Secretary of Legation; and served as ambassador in Copenhagen (1864), took part in negotiating the Treaty of Prague (1866), and from Berlin went to Constantinople (1868), Athens (1869), The Hague (1872), and in 1877 to the Italian court. He represented Austria-Hungary at the Congress of Berlin in 1878 and served as foreign minister from 1879 to 1881. In this post he was especially active in effecting friendly relations with Italy and cementing the alliance with Germany.

== Publications ==
- Alfred Ritter von Arneth, Heinrich Freiherr von Haymerle (Berlin, 1882)

Preceded by Count Andrássy	Austro-Hungarian Minister of Foreign Affairs; 1879–1881	Succeeded by Count Kálnoky
