= Anton Graf von Wolkenstein-Trostburg =

Austro-Hungarian diplomat

Graf Anton Karl Simon von Wolkenstein-Trostburg
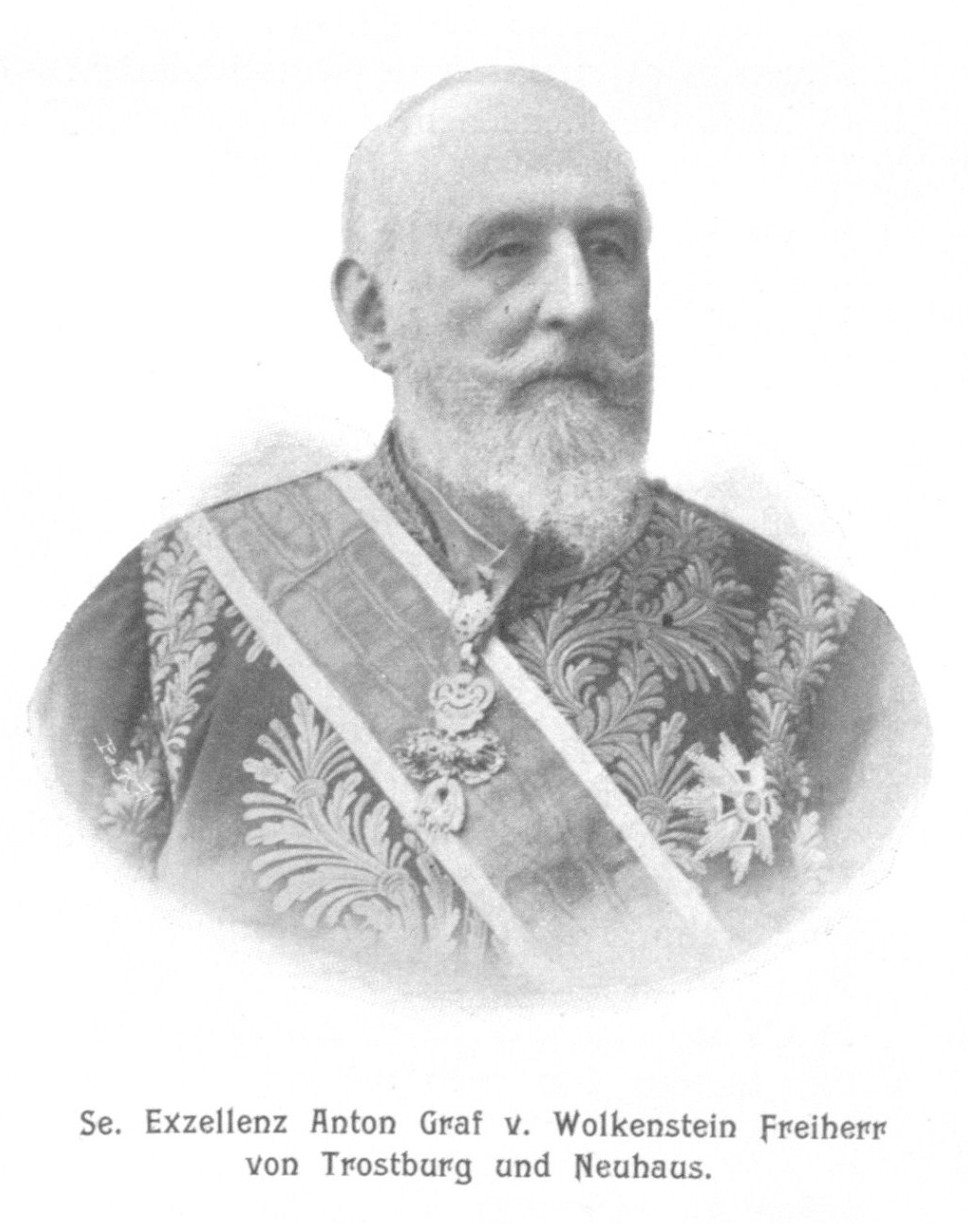
- Count Anton von Wolkenstein-Trostburg, 1903
- Born: 2 August 1832; Brunnersdorf (now Prunéřov, part of Kadaň, Czech Republic)
- Died: 5 December 1913 (aged 81); Castel Ivano (now Valsugana, part of Trentino, Italy)
- Occupation: Diplomat
- Known for: Austro-Hungarian Ambassador in St. Petersburg, Austro-Hungarian Ambassador in Paris
- Spouse: Countess Marie von Schleinitz née Marie von Buch (m. 1886; died 1912)
- Awards: Order of the Golden Fleece (1889)

Anton Karl Simon Graf von Wolkenstein-Trostburg (2 August 1832 – 5 December 1913) was an Austro-Hungarian diplomat.

== Biography ==
Count Wolkenstein-Trostburg was born in Brunnersdorf (now Prunéřov, part of Kadaň in the Czech Republic). Initially in the military, he entered the diplomatic service in 1858 and became Counselor in London in 1870, in Berlin in 1877 and Envoy Extraordinary in Dresden in 1880. In 1881 he became section chief of the trade policy department in the Ministry of Foreign Affairs. He was involved in the negotiations on the Danube Crisis and in the conclusion of the trade agreements with the German Reich of 1878 and 1881.

Finally, in March 1882, he became Austro-Hungarian Ambassador in St. Petersburg, a post he held for 12 years. In October 1894 he became Austro-Hungarian Ambassador in Paris for the next 9 years. He received the Order of the Golden Fleece in 1889.

He married in 1886 with Countess Marie von Schleinitz (1842–1912, née Marie von Buch), widow of Count Alexander von Schleinitz, and an influential salonnière in Berlin and one of the most important supporters of Richard Wagner. In 1903 he retired from the diplomatic service and from then on lived with his wife in Berlin, where she ran a famous literary salon in the Palast Hotel. The couple spent the warm season at Ivano Castle in Trentino, where the Count died in 1913, six months before the outbreak of the First World War.
