= Philipp Ludwig Wenzel von Sinzendorf =

Austrian diplomat and statesman (1671–1742)

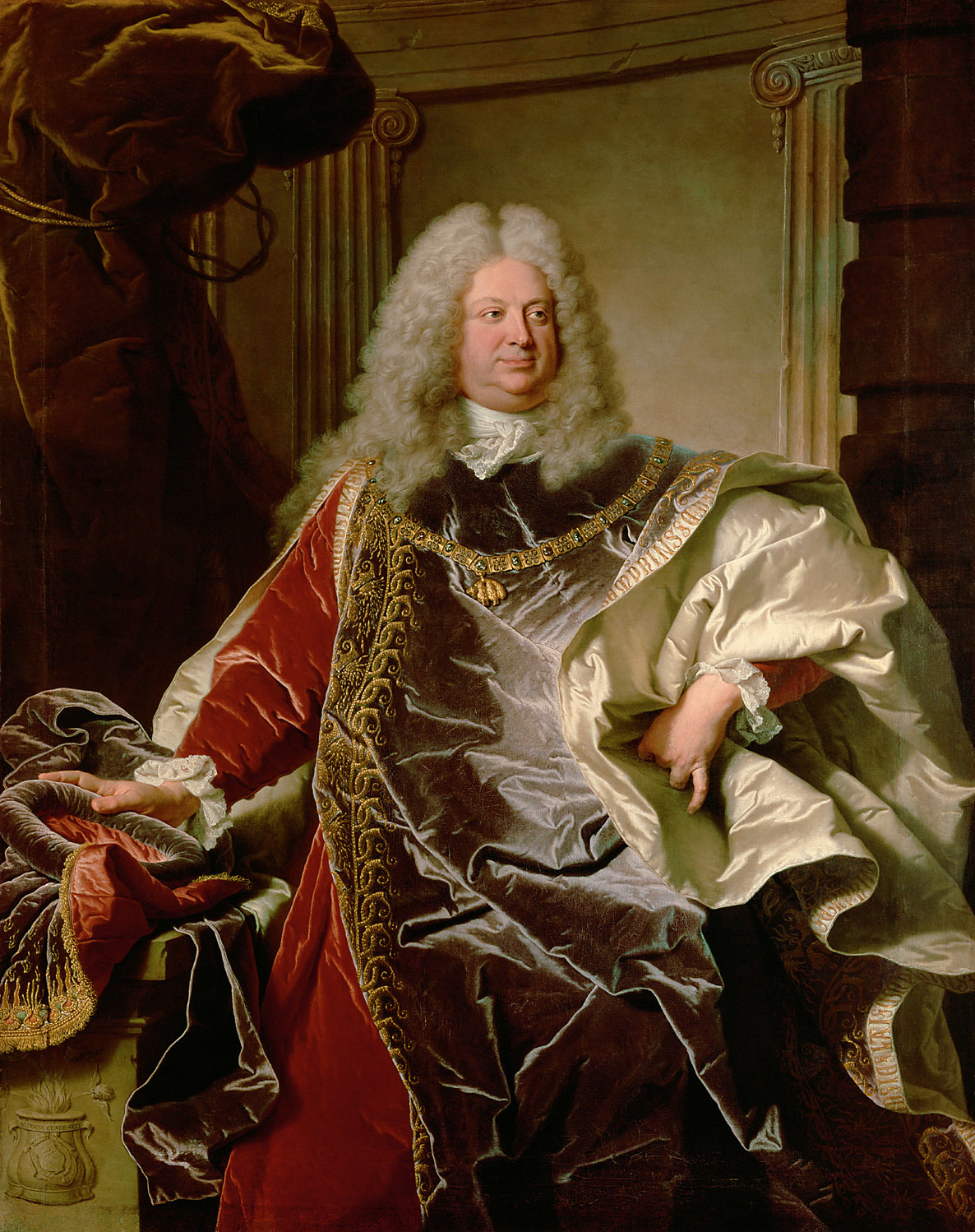
Philipp Ludwig Wenzel von Sinzendorf by Hyacinthe Rigaud, 1728.

Philipp Ludwig Wenzel von Sinzendorf (26 December 1671 – 8 February 1742) was an Austrian diplomat and statesman who for nearly four decades served as Court Chancellor responsible of foreign affairs of the Habsburg monarchy.

== Origin ==
He was born in the Austrian capital Vienna, into the prominent House of Sinzendorf, as the son of Count Georg Ludwig von Sinzendorf (1616–1681), and his wife, Duchess Dorothea Elisabeth of Schleswig-Holstein-Sonderburg-Wiesenburg (1645–1725). His father served as president of the Habsburg court chamber under Emperor Leopold I. After the emperor led a thorough examination of his financial irregularities, Georg Ludwig was sentenced to life imprisonment, but his wife managed the commutation of the sentence into house arrest in one of the palaces of the family. As a younger son of this marriage, Philipp Ludwig was designated early for an ecclesiastical career and joined the cathedral chapter in Cologne.

== Rise ==
After his brother's death in the Battle of Mohács (1687), he returned to secular life. Philipp Ludwig von Sinzendorf initially entered military service. The emperor noticed him and appointed him in 1694 as treasurer. As a result, he was entrusted with various diplomatic missions. In 1696 he married the Countess Rosina Katharina Isabella Rosalia von Waldstein-Wartenberg (1672–1733), widow of Count Wilhelm of Löwenstein-Wertheim-Rochefort (1669–1696). With her he had four children. Among them was the later Cardinal Philipp Ludwig von Sinzendorf.

In 1699, hardly a 28-year-old, he was appointed Ambassador to the court of Versailles. After the beginning of the War of Spanish Succession, he had to leave France. In 1701 he was appointed Privy Council. Along with the future Emperor Joseph I, he participated in the siege of Landau, one of the longest in the War of the Spanish Succession. After that, he was commissioner in Liege. Here, he dismissed the Prince-bishop of Liège Joseph Clemens of Bavaria, whose brother fought with France against Austria, and introduced a new government. In 1704, he concluded the Imperial Evacuation Treaty with the Elector of Bavaria after the great victory in the Battle of Blenheim.

== Court Chancellor ==
After the death of Emperor Leopold, Sinzendorf gained the favor of Emperor Joseph I, who made him in 1705 Court Chancellor (Obersthofkanzler). He was also the protector of the Imperial Academy of Arts. He was a central figure for four decades, especially in the foreign policy of the Habsburg Empire. In 1706 he negotiated in The Hague with John Churchill, 1st Duke of Marlborough and the Netherlands' representatives. He was next to Eugene of Savoy in 1709 and negotiator in the negotiations to a preliminary peace that failed, because of the excessive demands from the side of Sinzendorf. In this way he succeeded in preventing a premature Austrian demand for peace.

The Emperor rewarded Sinzendorf for his services by awarding him the fiefs of Hals and Schärding in Bavaria. Surprised by the death of the Emperor in The Hague, he went immediately to Frankfurt am Main to lobby for the election of Charles VI as Holy Roman Emperor. After the election, Charles VI confirmed Sinzendorf in his offices and while he accompanied Charles to his coronation in Frankfurt, Charles VI appointed him Knight of the Golden Fleece.

In negotiating the Treaty of Utrecht, Sinzendorf teamed up with Prince Eugene and tried in vain to persuade the former allies to continue the war. Back in Vienna, he was appointed as Privy Conference Minister. He was since then not only responsible for the exterior, but also for domestic politics. Since 1721 he was also the director of the Imperial Privileged Oriental Company (Kaiserliche privilegierte orientalische Kompagnie). At the Congress of Soissons to end the Anglo-Spanish War (1727–29), he opened the negotiations. He came in contact with the French cardinal and statesman André-Hercule de Fleury. His efforts were in vain and he returned to Vienna. In the negotiations with the Protestants in Hungary, he was present in 1734 as the only layman. He was an ardent supporter of the marriage of Maria Theresa and Francis Stephen of Lorraine. This he did also because he hoped it would bring him personal material benefits. After the War of the Polish Succession, Sinzendorf led the peace negotiations for Austria, which led to the Treaty of Vienna (1738). The defeats of the Imperial forces in the Austro-Russian–Turkish War (1735–39) prompted him to urge the Emperor to an early peace.

After the emperor's death, he supported Maria Theresa in claiming her inheritance rights. Even in the early years of the Austrian Succession War, he remained in the service of the Empress.

== See also ==
- List of Austrian ambassadors to Turkey

== Notes and references ==
- Wurzbach, Constantin von (1877). "Sinzendorf, Philipp Ludwig Wenzel". Biographisches Lexikon des Kaiserthums Oesterreich (in German). Vol. 35. Vienna: Theil. Kaiserlich-königliche Hof- und Staatsdruckerei. pp. 20–22.
- Nádudvar, Árpád Győry von (1892). "Sinzendorf, Philipp Ludwig". Allgemeine Deutsche Biographie (in German). Vol. 34. Leipzig: Duncker & Humblot. pp. 408–412.
- Media related to Philipp Ludwig Wenzel von Sinzendorf at Wikimedia Commons
