= Austro-Hungarian Foreign Service =

Diplomatic service from 1867 to 1918

The Austro-Hungarian Foreign Service (German: k. u. k. Auswärtige Dienst) was the diplomatic service carrying out the foreign policy of the Emperor of the Austro-Hungarian Empire from the formation of the Dual Monarchy in 1867 until it was dissolved in 1918.

== Diplomatic missions ==
Diplomatic relations overall were more limited at this time as there were much fewer sovereign states. In 1914, only 57 states could be considered as sovereign (compared to some 190 today).

When the centrally organised Foreign Ministry of the Habsburg Empire was created in 1720, there were 19 diplomatic missions, of which the oldest one was in Constantinople established in 1547. Over time, new diplomatic missions were established and some were closed down, mostly due to the end of the receiving state. The last diplomatic mission was established in 1917 in Christiania (now Oslo).

Furthermore, before World War II there was a division between embassies and legations based on the system of diplomatic ranks established by the Congress of Vienna of 1815. Until the mid-20th century, most diplomatic representations were still legations as embassies were reserved for a few of the major world powers or close allies. The division between legations and embassies changed after World War II when it was no longer considered appropriate to treat states differently in line with the United Nations principle of equality of sovereign states, enshrined in the UN Charter.

In 1914, Austria-Hungary had thirty-four diplomatic missions of which ten were embassies, twenty-two were legations and two were diplomatic agencies. Of the ten embassies, only two, the ones in the United States and Japan were outside Europe and these had also been the last missions that had been raised to an embassy.

For a list of diplomatic missions, see List of diplomatic missions of Austria-Hungary.

== Heads of mission ==
The ranks and titles of the heads of mission were subject to constant changes over time until the Congress of Vienna for the first time established a general system.

With the Congress of Vienna, the diplomatic representative in charge of an embassy was styled Ambassador Extraordinary and Plenipotentiary (German: außerordentlicher und bevollmächtiger Botschafter), usually referred to as an Ambassador, while the one in charge of a legation was styled Envoy Extraordinary and Minister Plenipotentiary (German: außerordentlicher Gesandte und bevollmächtiger Minister), normally referred to as a Minister. As the name indicates a Minister also had plenipotentiary powers (i.e. full authority to represent the head of state), but was ranking below an Ambassador. While the rank of Minister now is effectively obsolete, it was the most common title at the time of the Dual Monarchy.

The KuK monarchy had 22 ministers in 39 states: Albania; Argentina, Paraguay, and Uruguay; Bavaria; Belgium; Brazil; Bulgaria; Chile, Bolivia, and Peru; China; Denmark and Norway; Greece; Mexico; Montenegro; the Netherlands and Luxembourg; Persia; Portugal; Rumania; Saxony, Saxe-Weimar-Eisenach, Saxe-Meiningen, Saxe-Coburg-Gotha, Saxe-Altenburg, Anhalt, Schwarzburg-Rudolstadt, Schwarzburg-Sondershausen, and the elder and younger branches of Reuss; Sweden; Switzerland; Serbia; Siam; and Württemberg, Baden, and Hesse.

The title of ambassador had been used before the Congress of Vienna by the Habsburg Empire, but all relations at ambassadorial level, whether permanent or temporary, were downgraded in 1849 following the revolution. In 1856, the diplomatic mission at the Holy See and Paris were again raised to embassies, followed by London in 1860 and St. Petersburg in 1874. Between 1867 and 1909, six legations were raised from legations to embassies: Constantinople (1867), Berlin (1871), Rome (1877), Madrid (1888), Washington D.C. (1903) and Tokyo (1908).

In 1914, there were twenty-two ministers who were accredited to thirty-nine countries, most of them side accreditations to various German principalities.

== Diplomatic corps ==
The staff of the foreign service belonged to a different branch than both the staff at the central office at the Ballhausplatz in Vienna and the consular service. In 1914, the diplomatic corps numbered approximately 123 members, of which the absolute majority composed the diplomatic missions.

== See also ==
- Foreign Ministry of Austria-Hungary
- List of foreign ministers of Austria-Hungary
- List of diplomatic missions of Austria-Hungary

== Bibliography ==
- William D. Godsey, Aristocratic Redoubt: The Austro-Hungarian Foreign Office on the Eve of the First World War, West Lafayette, Purdue University Press, 1999.
- Jahrbuch des k.u.k. Auswärtigen Dienstes, 22 vols., Vienna, K.K. Hof- und Staatsdruckerei, 1897–1918.
- Erwin Matsch, Der Auswärtige Dienst von Österreich-Ungarn 1720-1920, Vienna, Böhlau, 1986.
- Erwin Matsch, Geschichte des Auswärtigen Dienstes von Österreich-Ungarn 1720-1920, Vienna, Böhlau, 1980.
