= Foreign Ministry of Austria-Hungary =

Austro-Hungarian government ministry

The Imperial and Royal Foreign Ministry (German: k. u. k. Ministerium des Äußern) was the ministry responsible for the foreign relations of the Austro-Hungarian Empire from the formation of the Dual Monarchy in 1867 until it was dissolved in 1918.

== History ==
The history of Austrian diplomatic service began in 1720 when Emperor Charles VI appointed his court chancellor, Count Philipp Ludwig Wenzel von Sinzendorf, Minister of the Privy Conference, responsible for the foreign affairs of the Habsburg monarchy. From 1753 to 1792 Austrian foreign policy was headed by State Chancellor Prince Wenzel Anton of Kaunitz-Rietberg.

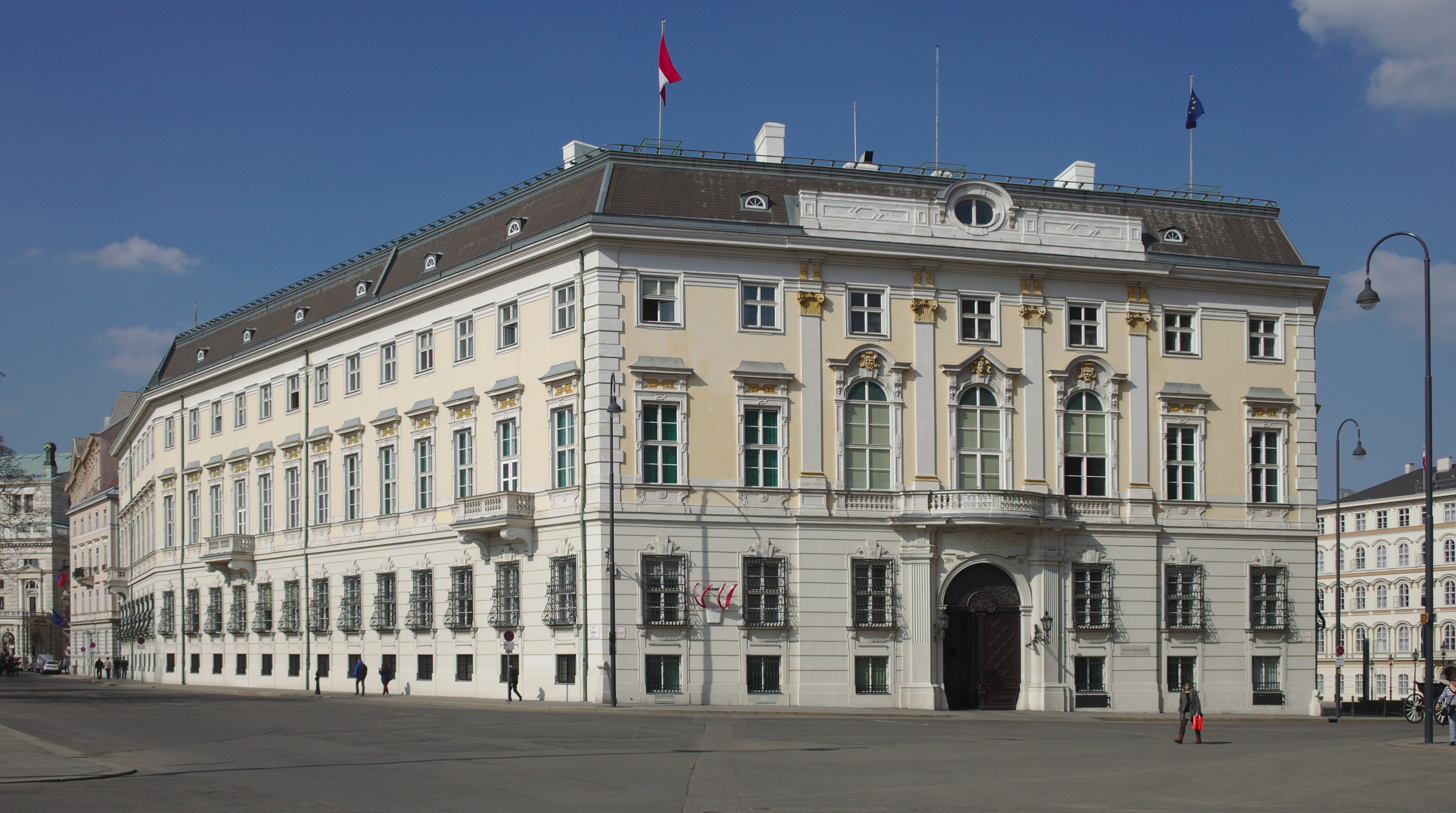
Former Foreign Ministry on Ballhausplatz

After the proclamation of the Austrian Empire in 1804, foreign affairs remained a prerogative of the Emperor and his appointed minister; epitomized by Prince Klemens von Metternich who held the office (1809-1848) throughout the Biedermeier period and made his Geheime Hofkanzlei on Ballhausplatz next to Hofburg Palace in Vienna a European centre of power. The Baroque building, venue of the 1814-1815 Vienna Congress, had been erected in 1719 according to plans designed by Johann Lukas von Hildebrandt. The word Ballhausplatz was often used as a metonym for the ministry, similar to Downing Street or Quai d'Orsay.

From 1867, the Foreign Ministry was one of the three common ministries (kaiserlich und königlich, often abbreviated k.u.k.) established in the Austro-Hungarian Compromise, together with the Ministry of War and Joint Ministry of Finance concerned for the common aspects of the dual monarchy, i.e. the foreign policy, the Austro-Hungarian Army and the Navy. The Minister of the Imperial and Royal House and of Foreign Affairs was nominated by the Emperor; he was also chairman of the Ministers' Council for Common Affairs as governing body of the Austro-Hungarian real union. The headquarters of the ministry remained at No. 2 Ballhausplatz.

Directly beneath the minister in the ministry hierarchy stood the First Section Chief (equivalent to an Undersecretary) who deputised for the minister and was in charge of administrative affairs. The Second Section Chief (equivalent to a Head of Political Section) was lower in the hierarchy, but was in charge of the political departments of the ministry. The Evidenzbureau, the intelligence agency of Austro-Hungary, reported to the Foreign Ministry from its inception in 1850 until the outbreak of the First World War in 1914, when it was made subordinate to the General Staff.

Over the decades, the diplomatic service was not able to attenuate the impression of Austria-Hungary as a potential adversary of numerous European states. In 1882 Foreign Minister Count Gustav Kálnoky succeeded in extending the Dual Alliance with the German Empire into a Triple Alliance of collective defense with the Kingdom of Italy, however, the coalition broke up in World War I, while the multi-ethnic Austro-Hungarian monarchy eventually succumbed to nationalist aspirations in 1918. Foreign Minister Count Leopold Berchtold sparked the 1914 July Crisis by his ultimatum to Serbia; he and Chief of Staff Count Franz Conrad von Hötzendorf persuaded the aged Emperor Franz Joseph (r. 1848–1916) to declare war.

At the end of the war, the Austro-Hungarian Dual Monarchy collapsed (October 1918) and the governmental powers in German Austria were taken over by the government of State Chancellor Karl Renner by resolution of the Provisional Assembly on 12 November 1918. The last Austro-Hungarian foreign minister, Ludwig von Flotow, did not resign until 8 November 1920.

== See also ==
- Austro-Hungarian Foreign Service
- List of diplomatic missions of Austria-Hungary
- Foreign Ministry of the Republic of Austria
- Foreign Ministry of the Republic of Hungary

== Bibliography ==
- F.R. Bridge, From Sadowa to Sarajevo: The Foreign Policy of Austria–Hungary 1866–1914 (1972).
- William D. Godsey, Aristocratic Redoubt: The Austro-Hungarian Foreign Office on the Eve of the First World War, West Lafayette, Purdue University Press, 1999.
- Jahrbuch des k.u.k. Auswärtigen Dienstes, 22 vols., Vienna, K.K. Hof- und Staatsdruckerei, 1897–1918.
- Erwin Matsch, Geschichte des Auswärtigen Dienstes von Österreich-Ungarn 1720-1920, Vienna, Böhlau, 1980.
- —, Der Auswärtige Dienst von Österreich-Ungarn 1720-1920, Vienna, Böhlau, 1986.
