= List of Finnish treaties =

This is a list of more important international treaties signed by Finland from 1917 onwards.

- Treaty of Peace between Finland and Germany (1918)
- Treaty of Peace between Austria-Hungary and Finland (1918)
- Treaty of Tartu (1920) with Bolshevist Russia
- Arbitration on Åland (1921) by the League of Nations
- International treaties on Åland (1921)
- Soviet-Finnish non-aggression pact (1932)
- Moscow Peace Treaty (1940) with the Soviet Union (obsolete)
- Anti-Comintern Pact (1941) with Nazi Germany during World War II
- Ryti–Ribbentrop Agreement (1944)
- Moscow Armistice (1944) with the Soviet Union (many provisions considered obsolete with the dissolution of the Soviet Union)
- Paris Peace Treaty (1947) with the Allies (many provisions considered obsolete)
- Agreement of Friendship, Cooperation, and Mutual Assistance (1948 YYA Treaty) with the Soviet Union (considered obsolete)
- Nordic Council (1955), became a member
- United Nations (1955), became a member
- Porkkala Restitution (1956)
- European Free Trade Association (1961), became an associate member
- Helsinki Treaty (1962) with Denmark, Iceland, Norway, and Sweden
- Helsinki Accords (1975) with Conference on Security and Co-operation in Europe
- European Free Trade Association (1986), became a full member
- Council of Europe (1989), became a member
- Paris Charter (since 1990)
- Partnership for Peace (1994)
- Treaty of Accession to the European union (1994), became a member in 1995
- Nordic Battlegroup / EU Battlegroup (2008), became a full member
- Ottawa Treaty (2012)
- Joint Expeditionary Force (2014), became member
- NATO (2023), became a member
- Defense Cooperation Agreement (2023) with the United States
- ICE Pact (2024) with the United States and Canada

== See also ==
- History of Finland
- List of Finnish wars
- List of treaties
