= Spitzmüller =

Spitzmüller is a German surname. Notable people with the surname include:

- Alexander Spitzmüller (1862–1953), Austrian lawyer, bank director, and politician
- Anna Spitzmüller (1903–2001), Austrian art historian, curator, and educator
- István Spitzmüller (born 1986), Hungarian footballer

== See also ==
- Pamela Spitzmueller (1950–2025), American conservator and book artist
