= Salzburg negotiations =

Negotiations between Austro-Hungarian monarchy and the German Reich

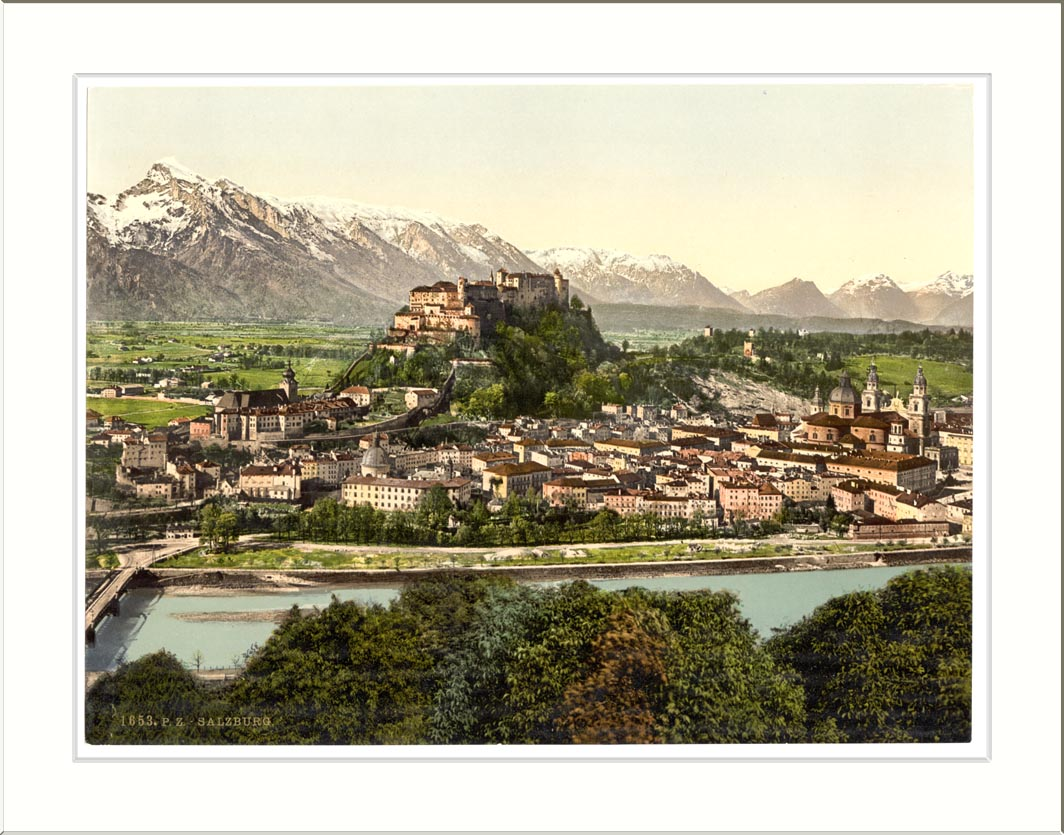
Salzburg, on the German-Austrian-Hungarian border, hosted negotiations on economic rapprochement between the Reich and the dual monarchy.

The Salzburg negotiations were bilateral diplomatic talks designed to precisely and rigorously define the practical details of the economic rapprochement between the dual Austro-Hungarian monarchy and the German Reich. (Note: Subsequently referred to simply as Reich. Between 1871 and 1945, the official name of the German state was Deutsches Reich.) These talks began on July 9, 1918, in Salzburg, an Austrian city close to the German–Austro-Hungarian border, and were intended above all to implement the decisions of principle imposed on Emperor Charles I and his ministers by Emperor Wilhelm II and his advisors at their meeting in Spa on May 12, 1918. Continued throughout the summer, these negotiations were suspended on October 19, 1918, when, without having informed the German negotiators, the Foreign Minister of the Dual Monarchy, Stephan Burián von Rajecz, ordered the Austro-Hungarian delegation to interrupt its participation in the talks, which had been rendered pointless by the imminent military and political collapse of the Dual Monarchy.

== Context ==
=== Spa agreements of May 12, 1918 ===
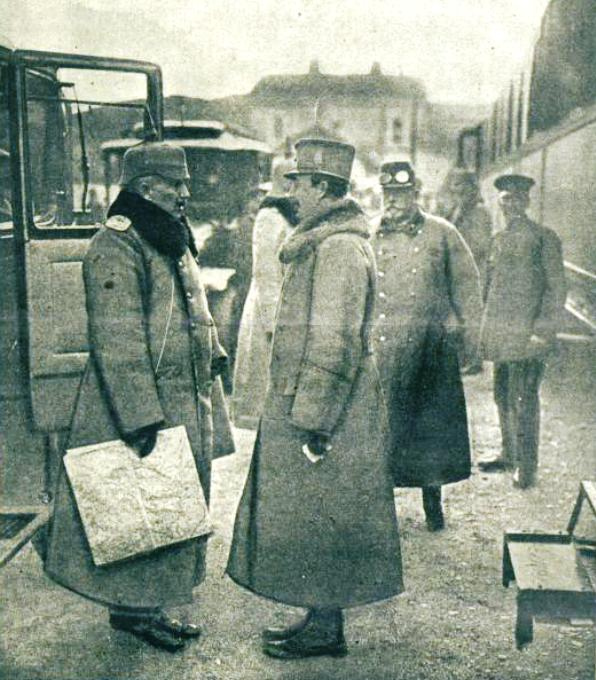
Wilhelm II, left, imposes on Charles I of Austria, right, the economic trusteeship of the dual monarchy in favor of the Reich.

At his meeting with Emperor Wilhelm II in Spa on May 12, 1918, Charles I and his minister Stephan Burián von Rajecz were forced to accept the political and economic subjection of the Habsburg Empire to the Reich. This subjection took the form of a treaty between the two empires, binding them tightly together. Formally concluded on an equal footing between the signatory powers, the Reich and the dual monarchy, the Spa agreements of May 12 in fact endorsed the pre-eminence of the Reich and guaranteed its supremacy, while the Austro-Hungarian signatories, the Emperor and his Foreign Minister, Stephan Burián von Rajecz, were forced to place the Danube monarchy in a situation of political, economic and military dependence on the Reich.

However, the Spa agreement, which made the dual monarchy subject to an "Austro-German Zollverein", failed to put an end to rivalries in the Balkans and Eastern Europe, or to political disagreements over the end of the conflict or the future of occupied Poland. (Note: Until the very end of the conflict, Austro-Hungarian negotiators linked the German–Austro-Hungarian customs union to the resolution of the Polish question for the benefit of the dual monarchy.)

At the meeting on May 12, German and Austro-Hungarian negotiators agreed to set up technical commissions to put into practice the economic and commercial provisions of the agreement in principle between the emperors.

=== Austro-Hungarian exhaustion ===
At the beginning of 1918, the Dual Monarchy was more submissive than ever to the Reich and its policies, while the war effort accelerated its internal decay.

From the spring of 1915, the Dual Monarchy experienced severe food shortages, both at the front and in the rear, forcing the Austro-Hungarian government to resort to increasingly extreme means, such as hijacking food trains in transit on the Austro-Hungarian rail network. These hijackings served to deepen the mistrust of the Reich's political and military leaders towards their counterparts in the dual monarchy.

From the summer of 1915, the Austro-Hungarian fronts were increasingly held by armies in which German divisions formed the backbone. This presence helped to reinforce the double monarchy's satellite status, preventing the Austro-Hungarians from pursuing any autonomous policy within the alliance with the Reich. Thus, from the end of 1916, in application of the provisions of the German–Austro-Hungarian agreement of September 6, 1916, (Note: On September 6, 1916, Franz Joseph agreed to place the Austro-Hungarian army under the command of Emperor Wilhelm II.) the Austro-Hungarian army no longer enjoyed any real autonomy, while the training of soldiers and officers led to the inculcation of the elements of military doctrine used in the Imperial German Army. Finally, the joint army had to deal with the return of prisoners of war captured by the Russians: exhausted, they often refused to submit and organized themselves into maquis, undermining the Austrian and Hungarian governments' control over the territory of the dual monarchy.

Finally, on June 9, 1918, a few weeks before the opening of German–Austro-Hungarian negotiations, the Austro-Hungarian army launched its last major offensive of the conflict, on the Piave front, but, faced with a determined defense, suffered a serious defeat, resulting in the loss of 160,000 soldiers, killed, wounded or missing, and the last reserves of equipment of the dual monarchy.

=== Preparation ===
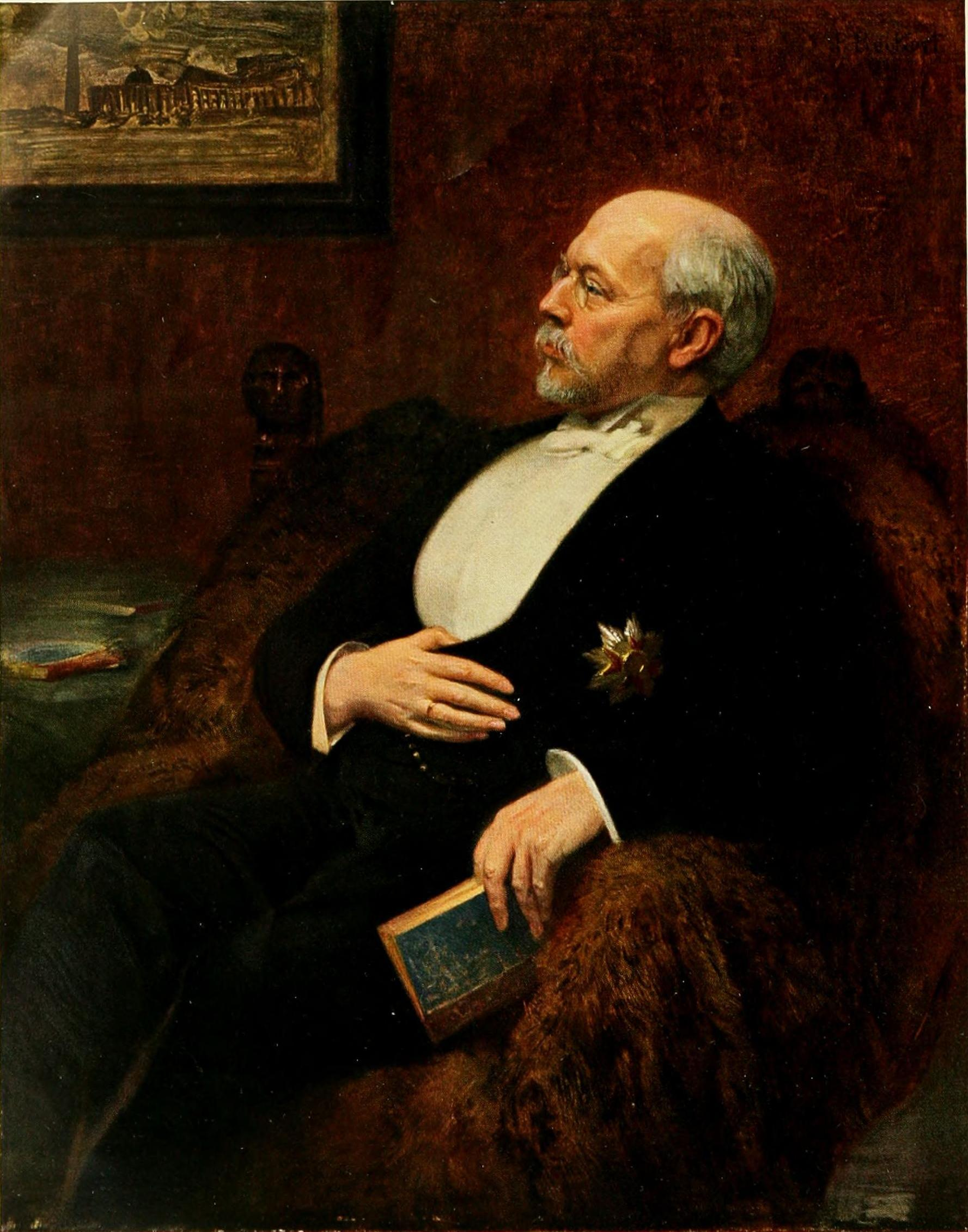
Georg von Hertling, pictured here in 1908, wanted to set up a German–Austro-Hungarian customs union.

The negotiations were meticulously prepared by the various German economic policymakers, representing both Prussia and the Reich. The main participants in German politics wanted to prepare for the end of the conflict, in the best commercial interests of the Reich, in these negotiations, as in all the economic policies they pursued in the spring and summer of 1918.

On June 7, 1918, all German and Prussian government officials met under the chairmanship of Imperial Chancellor Georg von Hertling. All in favor of placing the dual monarchy under economic trusteeship, as a springboard for the establishment of a German sphere of influence in the Balkans and beyond, (Note: German officials wanted the Ottoman Empire to be more closely integrated into the economic bloc led by the Reich.) the German officials in attendance clashed over the modalities of this takeover. On this occasion, the points proposed by Hans Karl von Stein, Prussian Minister of Trade, met with opposition from all the other attendants: the Chancellor, Georg von Hertling, Karl Helfferich and their advisors wanted to implement a customs union between the Reich and the Dual Monarchy. Against this bloc, the representatives of the economic ministries, as well as the business community, opposed the negotiation of such a customs union, not least because of the weakness of the Austro-Hungarian krone in relation to the Reichsmark. For example, Hans Karl von Stein, backed by the Prussian and Reich economic ministries and Reichsbank President Rudolf Havenstein, was hostile to any plans for a customs union between the two empires, preferring to tie Austria-Hungary in with a long-term trade treaty. Moreover, in the eyes of these economic leaders, aware of the weakness of the Austro-Hungarian economy, customs unification of the Reich and the dual monarchy would favor the latter, due to its lower production costs; in their view, the Reichsbank would be forced to intervene to support the Austro-Hungarian krone, and to accept a 25% devaluation of the Reichsmark to cushion the effects of the weak Austro-Hungarian currency on the Reich economy, without any guarantees given the unpredictable future of the dual monarchy. Acknowledging the existence of strong divergences within the Reich leadership itself, a commission met on June 10, 1918, reached agreement in principle on the Reich's final objective in these negotiations, but demanded the agreement of all Reich administrations competent in economic and commercial matters before opening negotiations with the Dual Monarchy.

Faced with this division, Stephan Burián von Rajecz, then Austro-Hungarian Foreign Minister, approached the forthcoming negotiations with great caution, at least in talks with his German counterpart Richard von Kühlmann on June 11 and 12, 1918. The Austro-Hungarian representatives implicitly stated their intention to empty the May 12 agreements of their commercial aspects, and to substitute preferential customs agreements for a customs union between the Reich and the Dual Monarchy, the option favored by the German negotiators at the time.

== Partial results ==
Meeting on July 9, 1918, the German and Austro-Hungarian delegations quickly drew up a joint declaration of principles, later referred to by Georges-Henri Soutou as the "Salzburg negotiations".

=== Customs agreements ===
Negotiations initially focused on the terms of a customs agreement between the Reich and the dual monarchy, as both partners wished to retain control over their own trade policies.

Despite this shared desire, the German and Austro-Hungarian negotiators soon came to an agreement: a common tariff scheme was drawn up, imposing identical customs duties on the other countries, with intermediate duties for products subject to different customs duties between the two empires. However, this project quickly aroused the open hostility of the agrarians, who were influential in Prussia, greatly slowing down the negotiations.

Among the outstanding points, the German and Austro-Hungarian negotiators attempted to define the customs regime uniting the Balkan states, which were destined to be reorganized under German influence, and the new German–Austro-Hungarian customs bloc. Indeed, a new, independent Serbian state was to form a pole of balance in the Balkans, reorganized for the benefit of the Reich; this new Serbia, however, was destined to be absorbed into the Mitteleuropa customs bloc. However, the precise status of the new Serbia was still up in the air, due to German–Austro-Hungarian rivalries: the Germans planned to enlarge Serbia to include Montenegro and part of Albania, and to link it closely to the Reich through control of its railways and the Bor copper mines; the Austro-Hungarians aspired to reconstitute a small kingdom deprived of its conquests of 1912 and 1913, while placing it under strict Austro-Hungarian political and economic tutelage.

=== Dissensions ===
Despite the shared desire of the Reich and Austria-Hungary to maintain control over their customs policy, each of the partners had to contend with the reservations of their respective pressure groups.

For example, the Hungarian negotiators on the Austro-Hungarian delegation in Salzburg were opposed to an agreement with the Reich on butcher's meat duties, as long as the equivalent agreement with Austria, pending since the conclusion of the Austro-Hungarian Compromise in 1917, had not been concluded with Austrian representatives.

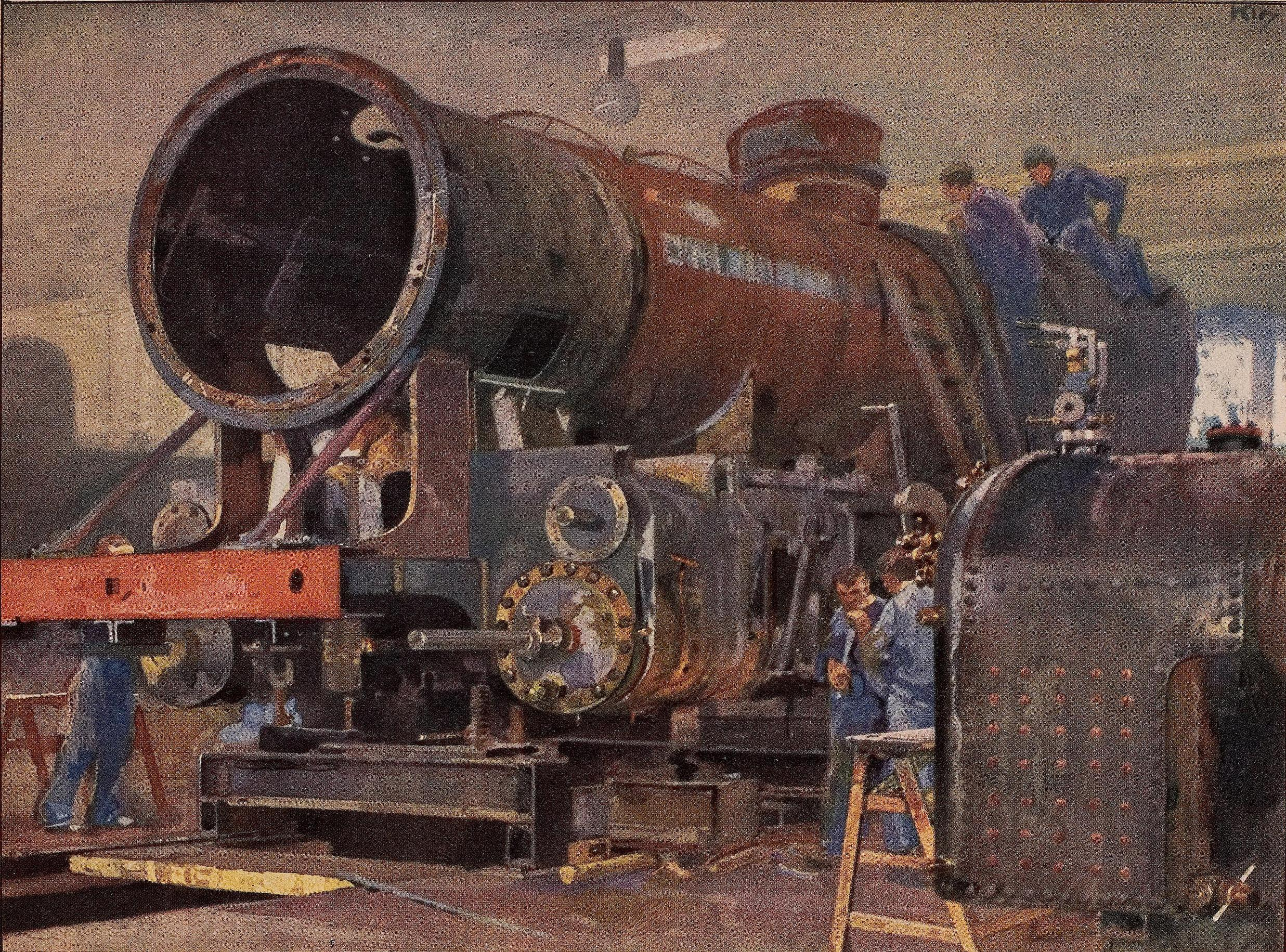
The Bavarian company KraussMaffei, manufacturer of railway equipment, was hostile to any rapprochement in the railway industry. Drawing by Heinrich Kley (1863-1945) showing workers at J. A. Maffei Lokomotiv in Munich.

In addition, the Germans also developed divergent views on economic relations with the Dual Monarchy. Representatives from the German states (Note: The Reich inherited from Bismarck was a federation within which each federated state retained internal autonomy.) expressed their reservations about too close a relationship with the Dual Monarchy. Members of the Prussian cabinet, mainly those in charge of the economic ministries, considered that a customs union with Austria-Hungary could, in the long term, harm the economic interests of the Kingdom of Prussia and favor Austro-Hungarian competition, made possible by an exchange rate favorable to the dual monarchy: for this reason, the Prussians favored the introduction of preferential tariffs, regularly negotiated between the two empires. The Bavarian government, which had sent a plenipotentiary to Salzburg, (Note: The Kingdom of Bavaria enjoyed a special status that enabled it to maintain its own diplomatic network.) showed itself to be a fervent supporter of closer ties in the field of electricity generation; however, representatives of KraussMaffei, a major Bavarian company in the mechanical engineering sector, (Note: The company mainly supplied railway equipment.) influenced the latter, which from then on was unflinchingly opposed to any rapprochement in this field.

Finally, the question of including territories controlled by the Central Powers in the German-Austrian-Hungarian customs union was another stumbling block between the Reich and the dual monarchy. The inclusion of Poland, Romania, Bulgaria, Serbia, Montenegro and Albania was at the heart of German–Austro-Hungarian friction: indeed, Austro-Hungarian representatives defended the devolution of Serbia and Montenegro to the Austro-Hungarian sphere of influence. However, spurred on by Erich Ludendorff, the German negotiators wanted to integrate these states into the new German–Austro-Hungarian customs union that was to emerge during the Salzburg negotiations.

== Final setback ==
Negotiations between the two empires failed to produce any general agreement, as the Reich and the Dual Monarchy were pursuing different objectives at this stage of the conflict. At the end of the conflict, moreover, the Germans found themselves in the same situation as after the Bosnian crisis, obliged both to keep the Dual Monarchy, the Reich's only reliable ally, in their alliance, and to control it closely.

=== Catastrophic situation ===
During the summer of 1918, the Allied blockade placed the Reich and the Dual Monarchy in a catastrophic economic situation. The fate of arms was unfavorable to the Central Powers, despite the ability of the German-Austrian-Hungarian armies to achieve partial victories over Allied troops, but these successes at the beginning of the first half of 1918 had no immediate effect. After the failure of the German offensives on the Western Front and the Austro-Hungarian offensive in Italy, Austro-German units no longer showed the bite necessary for victory, breaking down at the first shock or remaining incomplete due to massive desertions.

The Allied blockade weakened the situation of the Central Powers even further, by suffocating their economies: starving populations were fed with food manufactured by the ersatz industry, while industries working for the army were forced to supply the armies of the Quadruplice with inferior quality equipment to maintain production figures.

=== Suspension of negotiations ===
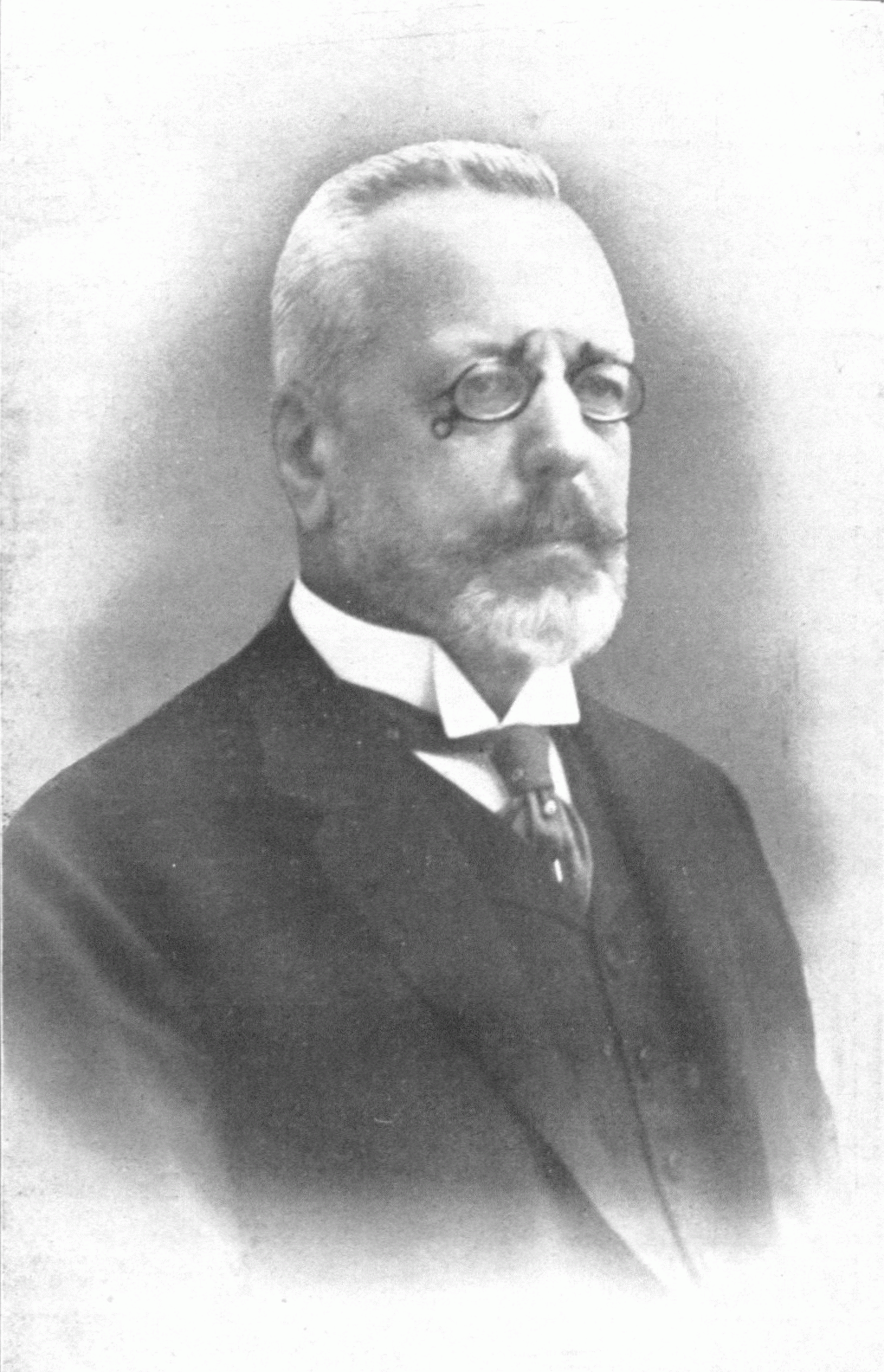
Stephan Burián von Rajecz, then Foreign Minister of the Dual Monarchy, pictured here in 1915, suspended negotiations on October 19.

On October 19, 1918, despite the intermediate progress achieved by the German negotiators during the session of the 12th, the Austro-Hungarian negotiators informed their German counterparts of the unilateral Austro-Hungarian decision to put an end to the negotiations, which the Bulgarian armistice and the rapid reconquest of Serbia by the Allied armies were rendering more futile by the day.

Indeed, during October 1918, Emperor and King Charles and the joint foreign minister of the dual monarchy, Stephan Burián von Rajecz, engaged in negotiations with the Allies for a separate armistice, tried desperately to put an end to Austro-Hungarian participation in the conflict. In addition, the two constituent parts of the Habsburg monarchy, Austria and Hungary, found themselves without government: on October 11, the Austrian and Hungarian governments resigned together, accelerating the process of advanced dissolution of the dual monarchy, amplified by Allied victories in the Balkans and on the Western Front, and by Emperor Charles's ill-fated initiatives to extricate his empire from the then lost conflict. (Note: on September 14, 1918, an Austro-Hungarian note to the Allies requesting the opening of peace negotiations went unanswered; on October 15, 1918, Emperor-King Charles published an imperial manifesto announcing a reform of the Austrian Empire, much to the fury of Hungarian officials, who envisaged a simple personal union between the two monarchies under the Habsburg scepter.)

=== Consequences ===
Despite the failure of these negotiations, they fuelled the Rattachist movement in Austria in the 1920s. West German historian Fritz Fischer emphasizes the political, economic and commercial continuities between these negotiations and the ones between the Republican and later Hitler's Reich, on the one hand, and the successor states to the dual monarchy, notably Austria and Hungary, on the other.

This view was seriously amended by Georges-Henri Soutou, based on the accounts of two of the Austro-Hungarian negotiators. Indeed, the French historian attributed to these negotiations the role of a "stone of hope for the future" and, in mentioning these recollections, also recalls the interest of the diplomats taking part in these negotiations in watering down after the war the outcome of negotiations whose failure was obvious in September 1918, and in attributing this failure to the defeat of the Reich by then consummated.

== See also ==
- Customs union
- Armistice of Salonica
- History of Austria-Hungary during World War I
- Mitteleuropa
- Spa Conference of May 12th 1918

== Bibliography ==
- Bled, Jean-Paul (2014). Taillandier (ed.). L'Agonie d'une monarchie: Autriche-Hongrie 1914-1920 [The Agony of a Monarchy: Austria-Hungary 1914-1920] (in French). Paris. ISBN 979-10-210-0440-5.
- Fischer, Fritz (1970). Trévise (ed.). Les Buts de guerre de l'Allemagne impériale (1914-1918) [Imperial Germany's war aims (1914-1918)] (in French). Paris.
- Gueniffey, Patrice; Lentz, Thierry (2016). Perrin (ed.). La Fin des empires [The End of Empires] (in French). Paris. ISBN 978-2-262-06551-5.
- Herwig, Holger Heinrich (2014). Bloomsbury Academic (ed.). The First World War: Germany and Austria-Hungary 1914-1918. London. ISBN 978-1-4725-1124-9.
- Kennedy, Paul Michael (1989). Payot (ed.). Naissance et déclin des grandes puissances : transformations économiques et conflits militaires entre 1500 et 2000 [The Rise and Fall of the Great Powers: economic transformations and military conflicts between 1500 and 2000] (in French). Paris. ISBN 978-2-228-88401-3.
- Lacroix-Riz, Annie (1996). Colin, Armand (ed.). Le Vatican, l'Europe et le Reich : De la Première Guerre mondiale à la guerre froide [The Vatican, Europe and the Reich: From the First World War to the Cold War] (in French). Paris. ISBN 978-2-200-21641-2.
- Le Naour, Jean-Yves (2016). Perrin (ed.). 1918 : l'étrange victoire [1918: the strange victory] (in French). Paris. ISBN 978-2-262-03038-4.
- Ortholan, Henri (2017). Giovannangeli, Bernard (ed.). L'armée austro-hongroise : 1867-1918 [The Austro-Hungarian army: 1867-1918] (in French). Paris. ISBN 978-2-7587-0180-4.
- Soutou, Georges-Henri (1989). Fayard (ed.). L'Or et le sang : les buts de guerre économiques de la Première Guerre mondiale [Gold and blood: the economic aims of the First World War] (in French). Paris. ISBN 2-213-02215-1.
