= Spa Conference (12 May 1918) =

During World War I, a conference took place between the German emperor Wilhelm II and the Austro-Hungarian monarch Charles I in Spa on 12 May 1918. At his meeting, Charles I and his minister Stephan Burián von Rajecz were forced to accept the political and economic subjection of Austria-Hungary to the German Empire in the form of a treaty. Formally concluded on an equal footing between the signatory powers, the agreements reached at Spa in fact endorsed the pre-eminence of Germany and guaranteed its supremacy, while the Austro-Hungarians were forced into a situation of political, economic and military dependence. However, the Spa agreement, which made the dual monarchy subject to an "Austro-German Zollverein" (customs union), failed to put an end to rivalries in the Balkans and Eastern Europe, or to political disagreements over the end of the conflict or the future of occupied Poland. At the meeting on May 12, German and Austro-Hungarian negotiators agreed to set up technical commissions to put into practice the economic and commercial provisions of the agreement in principle between the emperors. The subsequent Salzburg negotiations, however, fell apart in October with the imminent defeat of Germany and Austria-Hungary.

== See also ==
- Spa Conferences (First World War)
- Spa Conference (29 September 1918)
- Spa Conference (2-3 July 1918)

== Bibliography ==
- Bled, Jean-Paul (2014). Taillandier (ed.). L'Agonie d'une monarchie: Autriche-Hongrie 1914-1920 [The Agony of a Monarchy: Austria-Hungary 1914-1920] (in French). Paris. ISBN 979-10-210-0440-5.
- Fischer, Fritz (1970). Trévise (ed.). Les Buts de guerre de l'Allemagne impériale (1914-1918) [Imperial Germany's war aims (1914-1918)] (in French). Paris.
- Lacroix-Riz, Annie (1996). Colin, Armand (ed.). Le Vatican, l'Europe et le Reich : De la Première Guerre mondiale à la guerre froide [The Vatican, Europe and the Reich: From the First World War to the Cold War] (in French). Paris. ISBN 978-2-200-21641-2.
- Soutou, Georges-Henri (1989). Fayard (ed.). L'Or et le sang : les buts de guerre économiques de la Première Guerre mondiale [Gold and blood: the economic aims of the First World War] (in French). Paris. ISBN 2-213-02215-1.
