= Macchio =

Macchio is a surname. Notable people with the surname include:

- Baron Karl von Macchio (1859–1945), Austro-Hungarian diplomat
- Ralph Macchio (born 1961), American actor
- Ralph Macchio (born 1950), American comic book editor and writer
