= Serlachius =

Serlachius is a Finnish surname. Notable people with the surname include:

- Allan Serlachius (1870–1935), Finnish lawyer, professor, and politician
- Viveca Serlachius (1923–1993), Finnish-born Swedish actress
