= Baron von Müller =

Baron von Müller or Baron von Mueller can refer to:

- Ferdinand von Mueller (1825–1896), geographer and botanist
- Johann Wilhelm von Müller (1824–1866), explorer and ornithologist
- Baron Ladislaus Müller von Szentgyörgy (1855–?), diplomat
