= Baron Karl von Macchio =

Austro-Hungarian diplomat (1859–1945)

Karl Freiherr von Macchio
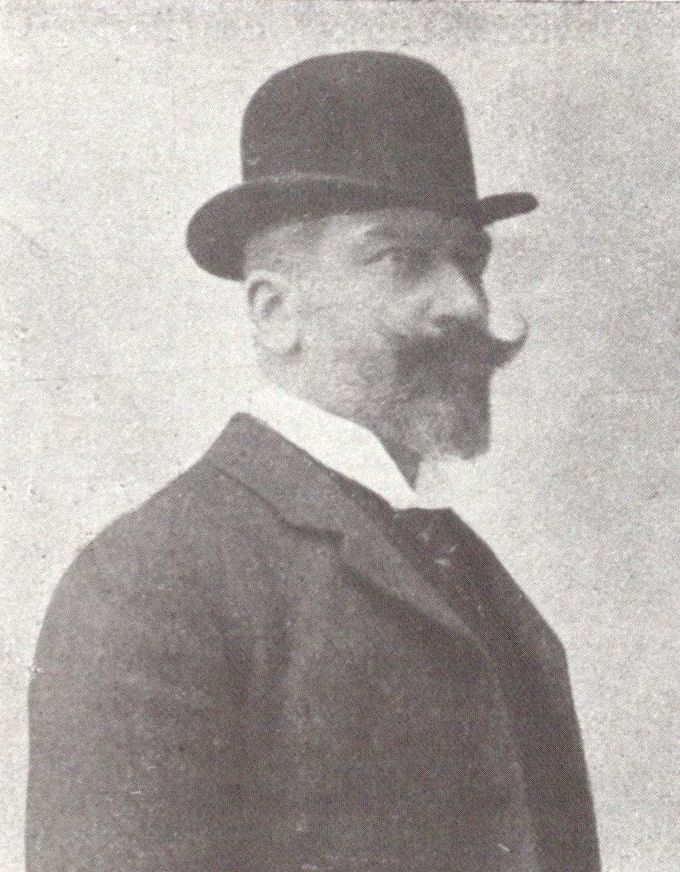

Austro-Hungarian Minister to Montenegro
- In office 3 February 1899 – 6 November 1903
- Monarch: Franz Joseph I
- Minister-President of Austria: Prince Franz Anton von Thun und Hohenstein; Count Manfred von Clary-Aldringen; Heinrich Ritter von Wittek; Ernest von Koerber
- Minister of Foreign Affairs: Agenor Maria Gołuchowski
- Preceded by: Eugen Ritter von Kuczyński
- Succeeded by: Otto Freiherr Kuhn von Kuhnenfeld

Austro-Hungarian Minister to Greece
- In office 6 November 1903 – 18 November 1908
- Monarch: Franz Joseph I
- Minister-President of Austria: Ernest von Koerber; Paul Gautsch von Frankenthurn; Prince Konrad of Hohenlohe-Schillingsfürst; Max Wladimir von Beck
- Minister of Foreign Affairs: Agenor Maria Gołuchowski; Alois Lexa von Aehrenthal
- Preceded by: Stephan Freiherr Burián von Rajecz
- Succeeded by: Karl Freiherr von Braun

Second Section Chief in the Imperial Foreign Ministry
- In office 10 January 1909 – 30 March 1912
- Preceded by: Ladislaus Müller von Szentgyörgy
- Succeeded by: Friedrich Graf Szapáry von Muraszombath, Széchysziget und Szapár

First Section Chief in the Imperial Foreign Ministry
- In office 30 March 1912 – 4 January 1917
- Preceded by: Baron Ladislaus Müller von Szentgyörgy
- Succeeded by: Baron Ladislaus Müller von Szentgyörgy

Personal details
- Born: 23 February 1859 Hermannstadt, Austria-Hungary (now Romania)
- Died: 1 April 1945 (aged 86) Vienna, Austria

Karl Freiherr von Macchio (23 February 1859 – 1 April 1945), was an Austro-Hungarian diplomat active before and during World War I.

== Life ==
Born in Hermannstadt (now Sibiu) on 23 February 1859 into a noble family originating from Lombardy. After studies in law, he joined the Austro-Hungarian foreign service in 1881 and served in Constantinople, Bucharest, St. Petersburg and Belgrade.

In 1899, he was appointed to serve as minister at Cetinje and then from 1903 in Athens succeeding Baron Burián von Rajecz, the future Foreign Minister. In 1907, he was a member of the Austro-Hungarian delegation to the Second Hague Peace Conference. In 1908, he was appointed a Privy Councillor (Geheimer Rat).

In January 1909, Baron von Macchio was appointed by Count Lexa von Aehrenthal, who considered him an "expert in Balkan questions", to serve as Second Section Chief (equivalent to a Head of Political Section) at the Ballhausplatz. He succeeded Baron Müller von Szentgyörgy who had been promoted to First Section Chief (equivalent to an Undersecretary) and would in March 1912 succeed him also in that position. During the July Crisis in 1914, he was therefore one of the closest collaborators of Foreign Minister Count von Berchtold but played a much more marginal role than the chef de cabinet Count von Hoyos and the Second Section Chief Count von Forgách

After the outbreak of war, Baron von Macchio was sent to Rome on 11 August 1914 on a special mission ("in außerordenlicher Mission") to support the embassy as the ambassador, Mérey, was ill. As such he was de facto ambassador with the title "außerordentlicher und bevollmächtigter Botschafter mit Titel und Charakter", although Mérey remained officially in charge. His mission in Rome was to prevent Italy from entering the war on the side of the Entente, but as the autumn passed it became increasingly clear that it was rather a question about delaying than preventing an Italian declaration of war against Austria-Hungary.

In January 1915, Baron von Macchio, supported by the German ambassador at Rome, the former Chancellor Prince von Bülow, sought to persuade Foreign Minister Count von Berchtold to cede the Trentino to Italy. As pressure mounted on Count Berchtold to accede in this direction, he was forced by the Hungarian Minister-President Count Tisza and the Chief of the General Staff General Conrad von Hötzendorf to resign.

Following Italy's declaration of war on 23 May 1915, Baron von Macchio returned to Vienna, where he continued in his function as First Section Chief until January 1917. After the war, he worked as a staff member of the Neue Freie Presse, a Viennese newspaper, covering international affairs.

Prince von Bülow and Matthias Erzberger blamed Baron von Macchio for the failure of the negotiations to prevent the entry of Italy into the war, but Baron von Macchio vehemently denied this in his memoirs, basing himself on Italian sources to justify his course of action.

Baron von Macchio died in Vienna on 1 April 1945.

== Works ==
- Wahrheit! Fürst Bülow und ich in Rom, 1914/1915, Vienna, Jung Österreich verlag, 1931.
- 'Momentbilder aus der Julikrise 1914', Berliner Monatshefte, no. 14, 1936, pp. 763–788.

Diplomatic posts
Preceded by Eugen Ritter von Kuczyński	Austro-Hungarian Minister to Montenegro; 1899–1903	Succeeded by Otto Freiherr Kuhn von Kuhnenfeld
Preceded by Stephan Freiherr Burián von Rajecz	Austro-Hungarian Minister to Greece; 1903–1908	Succeeded by Karl Freiherr von Braun
Preceded by Baron Ladislaus Müller von Szentgyörgy	Second Section Chief in the Imperial Foreign Ministry; 1909–1912	Succeeded by Friedrich Graf Szapáry von Muraszombath, Széchysziget und Szapár
Preceded by Baron Ladislaus Müller von Szentgyörgy	First Section Chief in the Imperial Foreign Ministry; 1912–1917	Succeeded by Baron Ladislaus Müller von Szentgyörgy
