= List of wars involving Finland =

This is a list of wars involving Finland since its declaration of independence on 6 December 1917.

== List ==
Conflict	Party 1	Party 2	Result	Finnish leaders		Finnish losses (dead or missing)
Conflict	Party 1	Party 2	Result	Head of State	Chief of Defence	Finnish losses (dead or missing)
Finnish Civil War (1918)	Finnish Whites; German Empire; Foreign volunteers: Swedish Brigade; Estonian volunteers; (Second Polish Republic) Polish Legion; (Russian Empire) White Army	Finnish Reds; (Russian Soviet Federative Socialist Republic) Soviet Russia	Finnish Whites victory: German hegemony until November 1918; Division in Finnish society; Collapse of the Finnish Reds; Dissolution of the Finnish Socialist Workers' Republic	Pehr Evind Svinhufvud	C. G. E. Mannerheim	~30,000 (Reds and Whites)
Heimosodat (1918–1922)	Finnish White Guard; Estonia; (Republic of Uhtua) Uhtua; (Republic of Uhtua) Forest Guerrillas; North Ingria; United Kingdom (Estonian War of Independence)	Russian SFSR; Finnish Red Guards; Commune of Estonia; United Kingdom; (Viena expedition and Petsamo expeditions)	Treaty of Tartu: Finnish victory in Estonia and annexation of Petsamo; Soviet victory in White Karelia, Aunus, Petrograd and East Karelia	K. J. Ståhlberg	Karl Fredrik Wilkama	~550
Winter War (1939–1940); Part of the European theatre of World War II	Finland: Foreign volunteers	Soviet Union: Finnish Democratic Republic	Moscow Peace Treaty: Soviet conquest of Finland fails; Cession of the Gulf of Finland islands, Karelian Isthmus, Ladoga Karelia, Salla, Rybachy Peninsula and lease of Hanko to the Soviet Union	Kyösti Kallio	C. G. E. Mannerheim	25,904
Continuation War (1941–1944); Part of the Eastern Front of World War II	Finland; Germany; Naval support: Italy (Note: Italian participation was limited to the four motor torpedo boats of the XII Squadriglia MAS serving in the international Naval Detachment K on Lake Ladoga during the summer and autumn of 1942.)	Soviet Union; Air support: United Kingdom	Defeat: Moscow Armistice; Start of the Lapland War; Petsamo ceded to the USSR; Porkkala Peninsula leased to the USSR for 50 years (Note: On 19 September 1955, Finland and the Soviet Union signed an agreement to return the Porkkala Peninsula to Finland. In January 1956, 12 years after its lease to the USSR, the Soviets withdrew from their naval base on Porkkala and the peninsula was returned to Finnish sovereignty.); Hanko retaken by Finland	Risto Ryti	C. G. E. Mannerheim	63,204
Lapland War (1944–1945); Part of the Second World War	(Finland) Finland; Minor air support: Soviet Union (Note: Minor air support in Operation Tanne Ost only. Further extent of Soviet belligerence in the Lapland War is debatable. Gebhardt and Ziemke mention the German withdrawal from Lapland and Finnmark, as well as the Soviet Petsamo–Kirkenes Offensive as operations of the Second World War that were either strategically overlapping or as a continuum of events without a clear stance. Jowett and Snodgrass write about the war as a conflict between German and Finnish troops, but include the offensive in the war's timeline. Zabecki begins by mentioning that Lapland extends to Norway and the Soviet Union. He states that the "Finnish War of Lapland" started between Finland and Germany, but links the Soviet offensive to it. Jaques writes of the offensive as a part of the war in a dictionary of battles.)	(Nazi Germany) Germany	Victory: German retreat from Finnish territory	C. G. E. Mannerheim	C. G. E. Mannerheim	1,036

== See also ==
- Military of the Grand Duchy of Finland
- Military history of Finland
- List of Finnish treaties
- Finland Guard Regiment

== Notes ==
=== Bibliography ===
- Ahto, Sampo (1980). Aseveljet vastakkain – Lapin sota 1944–1945 [Brothers in Arms Opposing Each Other – Lapland War 1944–1945] (in Finnish). Helsinki: Kirjayhtymä. ISBN 978-951-26-1726-5.
- Clements, Jonathan (2012). Mannerheim: President, Soldier, Spy. Haus Publishing. ISBN 978-1-908323-18-7. Archived from the original on 25 April 2023.
- Gebhardt, James F. (1989). The Petsamo-Kirkenes Operation: Soviet Breakthrough and Pursuit in the Arctic, October 1944 (PDF). Combat Studies Institute, U.S. Army Command and General Staff College. ISSN 0195-3451. OCLC 20490453. Archived from the original (PDF) on February 11, 2018.
- Jakobson, Max (1969). Finnish Neutrality: A Study of Finnish Foreign Policy Since the Second World War. New York: Praegar. ISBN 978-0-238-78818-5.
- Jaques, Tony (2007). Dictionary of battles and sieges: a guide to 8,500 battles from antiquity through the twenty-first century. Westport, Conn: Greenwood Press. ISBN 978-0-313-33536-5. OCLC 68786744.
- Jowett, Philip; Snodgrass, Brent (2012). Finland at War 1939–45. Bloomsbury Publishing. ISBN 978-1-78200-156-0. Archived from the original on 25 April 2023.
- Lackman, Matti (2009), Jääkäriliike. In: Haapala, P. & Hoppu, T. (eds.) Sisällissodan pikkujättiläinen, Helsinki: WSOY, pp. 48–57, ISBN 978-951-0-35452-0
- McMeekin, Sean (2017). The Russian Revolution: A New History. London: Profile Books. ISBN 978-1-78125-902-3.
- Pipes, Richard (1996). A Concise History of the Russian Revolution. New York: Vintage Books. ISBN 0-679-74544-0.
- Sturtivant, Ray (1990). British Naval Aviation: The Fleet Air Arm 1917–1990. London: Arms & Armour Press Ltd. ISBN 0-85368-938-5.
- Zapotoczny, Walter S. Jr. (2017). Decima Flottiglia MAS: The Best Commandos of the Second World War. Fonthill Media. ISBN 978-1-62545-113-2. Archived from the original on 21 February 2018.
- Zabecki, David T. (2015). Zabecki, David T. (ed.). World War II in Europe: an encyclopedia. Military history of the United States. New York: Garland Publishing. ISBN 978-0-8240-7029-8.
- Ziemke, Earl Frederick (2002). Stalingrad to Berlin: the German Defeat in the East. Washington: United States Army Center of Military History. ISBN 978-0-16-001962-3.
