= Treaty of Peace between Finland and Germany =

1918 treaty between Finland and Germany

The Treaty of Peace between Finland and Germany, (Note: CTS, Vol. 223, p. 109.) also called the Berlin Peace Treaty, signed in Berlin on 7 March 1918 ended the state of war that existed between Finland and the German Empire as a result of World War I. It paved the way for German intervention in the Finnish Civil War and the invasion of Åland.

According to one negative assessment, it placed Finland "firmly within the German orbit", rendering it "merely an economic satellite".

== Background ==
The Grand Duchy of Finland was a part of the Russian Empire at the time of Germany's declaration of war on Russia on 1 August 1914.

In 1917, Russia experienced two revolutions. In the February Revolution, the empire was overthrown and a provisional government established. In the October Revolution, the provisional government was deposed and the Russian Soviet Federative Socialist Republic established. On 6 December 1917, Finland declared its independence, which Russia recognized on 31 December. Finland nevertheless remained in the same state of war with the Central Powers (Germany, Austria-Hungary, Bulgaria and the Ottoman Empire) as it had been when a part of Russia.

Finnish overtures to Germany began even before the declaration of independence. In November 1917 the Finnish prime minister, Pehr Evind Svinhufvud, requested military assistance from Germany and the Germans landed 62 Finnish Jägers with equipment in Ostrobothnia. On 15 December, the Russian government signed an armistice with the Central Powers. When Edvard Immanuel Hjelt, the Finnish representative in Berlin, requested a German expeditionary force be landed in Finland, he was told that he would have to await the outcome of the Russian peace conference.

On 26 January 1918, a workers' uprising sparked the Finnish Civil War and the establishment a few days later of the Finnish Socialist Workers' Republic. More Jägers and equipment arrived from Germany to bolster the anti-socialist Finnish forces on 17 and 25 February. The armistice with the Central Powers expired on 18 February, and Soviet Russia and the Finnish workers' republic signed a treaty of friendship on 1 March 1918. Nevertheless, on 3 March Russia signed the Treaty of Brest-Litovsk and made peace with the Central Powers.

== Negotiation and signing ==
On 4 February, while the armistice was still in effect, the German Supreme Army Command asked Hjelt to renew his request of December 1917 for German troops. This he did and on 21 February he met with Generals Paul von Hindenburg and Erich Ludendorff in Kreuznach. On the same day the Treaty of Brest-Litovsk was signed, Major Werner Crantz, the German representative to the Finnish government represented by the Senate of Finland (as opposed to the workers' republic allied with Russia), announced that the expeditionary force was ready to sail.

Finno-German negotiations for a treaty of commerce and navigation began on 23 February. Formal negotiations for the peace treaty began on 28 February at the Auswärtiges Amt (Foreign Office) in Berlin. The German negotiators were the under-secretary of foreign affairs, Wilhelm von Stumm; the future first German ambassador to Finland, August von Brück; the privy councillor Ernst von Simson; the Foreign Office's eastern expert, Rudolf Nadolny; and Oskar Trautmann. The Finns were represented by Edvard Hjelt and Rafael Waldemar Erich, vice chancellor and professor, respectively, of the University of Helsinki.

The Finno-German peace treaty was signed four days after the Treaty of Brest-Litovsk. The signatories of the treaty were Chancellor Georg von Hertling for Germany and Hjelt and Erich for Finland.

== Terms ==
The treaty contains eleven chapters and 32 articles. The text of the treaty is in German. Ratifications were exchanged in Berlin on 25 June 1918.

In the treaty, both parties waived any claims to war damages, but provided for compensation to civilians who suffered war-related losses. Both also restored private property rights. Confiscated merchant ships and cargoes were to be returned. Germany also undertook to "work for the recognition by all states of Finland's independence", which almost gave the peace treaty the nature of a treaty of alliance. Article 18 mandated the exchange of prisoners of war with an exception for prisoners who did not want to be exchanged: "German prisoners of war in Finland and Finnish prisoners of war in Germany shall be exchanged as soon as possible ... unless they, with the consent of the capturing state, desire to remain with the latter's territory or betake themselves into another country."

Regarding Åland, which had been demilitarised in the Treaty of Paris (1856), Article 30 stated that "the contracting parties are agreed that the forts built upon the Åland Islands [by Russia] are to be removed as soon as possible, and that the permanent non-fortified character of these islands ... shall be settled by agreement between Germany, Finland, Russia and Sweden."

== Aftermath ==
After signing the peace treaty, Finland and Germany also signed a treaty of commerce and navigation (Note: CTS, Vol. 223, p. 127.) and a supplementary protocol to both treaties (Note: CTS, Vol. 223, p. 127.) the same day. They also subsequently exchanged notes to clarify the commerce treaty (7 March) and the peace treaty (11 March).

Rudolf Holsti, the Finnish representative in London, wrote in his report to the Senate on 27 March 1918 that "the German promise to guarantee the approval of Finnish independence has caused bad blood" in the British Foreign Office, where it was interpreted as a threat towards those Allied powers that had not yet recognized Finland: Italy, the United Kingdom and the United States.

In light of the German guarantee, the Senate requested and received German assistance against the Finnish Socialist Workers' Republic, which was substantially defeated by the end of April. The Senate then opted to turn Finland into a kingdom with a German king, but owing to Germany's defeat in the world war the modern republic was created instead.

A Finno-Bulgarian peace treaty (Note: CTS, Vol. 223, p. 372.) was also signed at Berlin on 21 May 1918 and an Austro-Hungarian–Finnish peace treaty was signed in Vienna on 29 May 1918. An agreement may also have been reached with the Ottoman Empire.
