= Anna Spitzmüller =

Austrian art historian

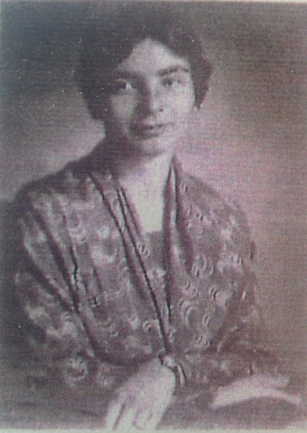
- Anna Spitzmüller in c. 1930
- Born: September 6, 1903; Znojmo, Moravia, Austria-Hungary
- Died: September 25, 2001 (aged 98); Vienna, Austria
- Years active: 1926-1987

Anna Spitzmüller (September 6, 1903 – September 25, 2001) was an Austrian art historian, curator, and educator. She taught art history to generations of American college students through the Austro-American Institute of Education.

== Early life ==
Spitzmüller was born on September 6, 1903 in Znojmo in Moravia, Austria-Hungary (now the Czech Republic), the daughter of an old Austro-Hungarian military family. Her mother also came from an aristocratic background, and her ancestral home still stands in Znojmo. Her father was Amadeo Spitzmüller von Tonalwehr (1871–1945), a high-ranking Imperial Army officer, and her "beloved uncle" was Alexander Spitzmüller, Freiherr von und zu Spitzmüller-Harmersbach (1862–1953), a well-known economist and banker who was the last imperial finance minister for the Austro-Hungarian Empire. Her grandfather originally came from Bukovina, one of the furthest regions of Austria-Hungary. She spent her earliest years in Prague, then a time in Olomouc. She learned to speak Czech among other languages. Her father was then stationed permanently at the War Ministry in Vienna, where she remained for the rest of her life. She later described her upbringing as "completely free and open", with an active social life among Austria's cultural elite. Dinner conversations were learned and scholarly; her father was very educated, and her mother was very musical. She was privately tutored as a girl, and learned French and English from governesses.

She then attended the Rahlgasse Mädchengymnasium, the first academic school for girls in Vienna. In 1920, impressed by an exhibition of tapestries at the Belvedere, she decided she wanted to be an art historian. In 1921, she enrolled at the University of Vienna to study with Josef Stryzgowski, controversial antagonist of the so-called Vienna School of Art History led by Max Dvořák and Julius von Schlosser. She received her degree in 1926 with her dissertation Die Brüder Strudel als Plastiker. Ein Beitrag zur Geschichte der Hofkunst Kaiser Leopold I ("The Strudel brothers as sculptors: A Contribution to the History of the Court Art of Emperor Leopold I"; Paul Strudel and Peter Strudel were the late 17th-century sculptors who created the oldest artists' academy in Central Europe).

== Career ==
Her first project after finishing her degree was an inventory of the major monuments of Carinthia, the southernmost province of present-day Austria, for the Dehio Handbuch der deutschen Kunstdenkmäler Österreichs. Lack of transportation meant she completed the inventory on foot. Returning to Vienna in the fall of 1926, she worked under the Albertina's director Alfred Stix (1882–1957), in one position or another, for the rest of her career. With Stix, she prepared the complete catalogue of the Albertina's drawings (Beschreibender Katalog der Handzeichnungen in der graphischen Sammlung Albertina); she was especially responsible for volume 6, Die Schulen von Ferrara, Bologna, Parma u. Modena, d. Lombardei, Genuas, Neapels u. Siziliens, on the collection's Italian works. When Stix was appointed to the Kunsthistorisches Museum in 1934, Spitzmüller's position at the Albertina became more important.

== Nazi period ==
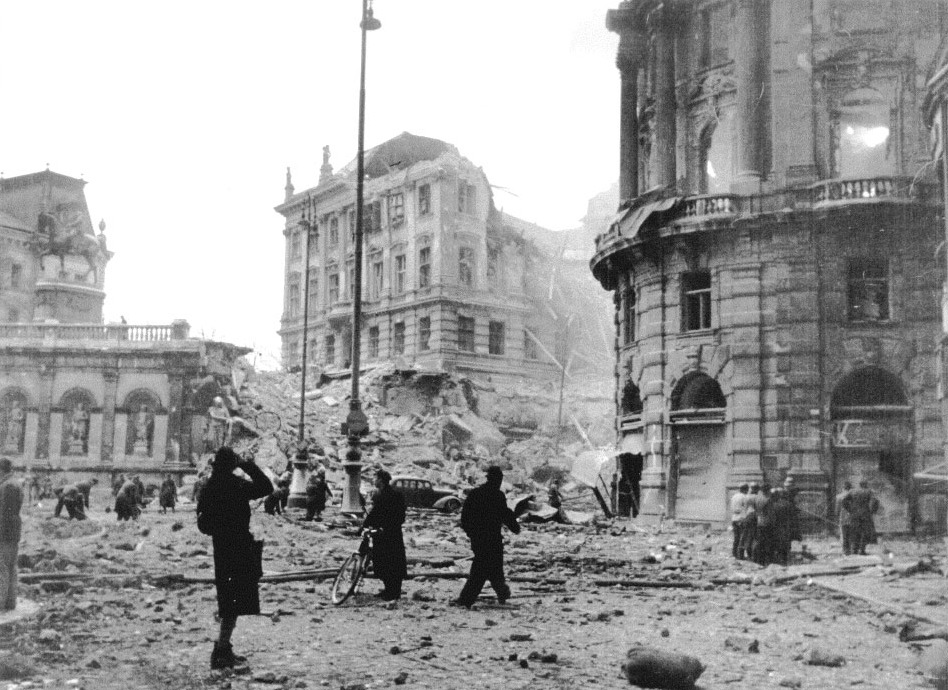
The bombed Albertinaplatz

With the Nazi takeover of Austria, Stix and Benesch lost their positions. Stix stayed in Vienna and worked, apparently surreptitiously, with Spitzmüller in the Albertina collections. Nazi directors were appointed at all the Viennese museums, but according to Spitzmüller, they were figureheads who had little impact on the running of the institutions. "We continued our research, but couldn’t publish anything", she recalled. As war became imminent, her most important task became to secure storage for the museum's collections, which was found in the salt mines of the Salzkammergut. After the war, American officials transferred all the Salzkammergut art objects to Munich, mixing the stolen German objects with the meticulously cataloged Austrian ones, so Spitzmüller was required to go there to sort through them.

On March 13, 1945, an Allied bomb struck the Albertina. Spitzmüller recalls that she and her colleagues were repairing the resulting hole in the museum's roof on the day Perry Blythe Cott (one of the "Monuments Men") visited them. With Cott, she went to Munich to retrieve the paintings and graphic art that had been stored before the war; she was able to see many of the Jewish artworks confiscated by the Nazis. During the war, she had met Otto Benesch's family, and through his father, Heinrich Benesch, an important art dealer and friend of Egon Schiele, had secured for the Albertina the Roessler collection of Schiele’s graphic art.

After the war, she spent much time in Vienna's French zone, organizing exhibitions and finally travelling to France to reestablish art contacts there. In 1946, she mounted a cooperative exhibition with the French, highlighting artworks in the Albertina's holdings. Her catalogue of the show, Französische Phantastik, was one of the first art publications produced in Vienna after the war.

== Later life ==
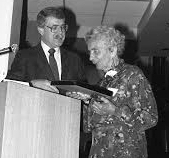
Spitzmüller being honored at Hope College in 1987

In 1948, Spitzmüller was appointed to the highest level of Curator in the governmental rankings, and remained at the Albertina until 1954. During this time, she worked on some of the first "little guides" to the Albertina’s collections, part of her ongoing efforts to make the collections more accessible. In 1953, she traveled to the United States to study graphic collections there; she once again saw Cott, and became lifelong friends with Agnes Mongan, curator of drawings at Harvard's Fogg Art Museum. Returning to Vienna, she left the Albertina to move to the Kunsthistorisches Museum, where she worked to make the museum more accessible to the public, to encourage school visits, and to sponsor symposiums and lecture series; she also was a founding member of the Austrian chapter of Zonta International. When she reached mandatory retirement age in 1969, she was given the title of Hofrat and made an honorary member of the Österreichischen Kunsthistorikerband; she also received the Chevalier ribbon of France's Ordre des Arts et des Lettres. In that same year, she gave a talk at the Library of Congress in Washington, D.C., on Bruegel's paintings.

In retirement, Spitzmüller continued teaching groups of American students through the Austro-American Institute of Education, which she had done since the 1930s (except during the war). In particular, she established a relationship with Hope College in Michigan, which brought groups of students to Vienna for summer school. In 1987, Hope College honored her in conjunction with an exhibition of Viennese art at the school.

Spitzmüller was also a talented musician, and participated in many activities involving the Vienna Philharmonic. In 1993, the Albertina, as part of a video history of the institution, interviewed her with special focus on her time there. She died on September 25, 2001, at the Heim der Kaufmannschaft in Vienna.

== Selected publications ==
- "Die Frau in der bildenden Kunst", in Martha Stephanie Braun, Frauenbewegung, Frauenbildung und Frauenarbeit in Österreich, Bund Osterreichischer Frauenvereine, 1930, pp. 320–324.
- "Deutsche Zeichnungen und Aquarelle, 1770–1830". Belvedere, vol. 18, pp. 57–62, 1931.
- "Un dessin de Wolf Huber au musée du Louvre", Gazette des beaux-arts / fondée par Charles Blanc. vol. 6, pér. 7, pp. 133–135, 1932.
- Kärnten, Karl Ginhart, Georg Dehio, and Fritz Novotny, eds. (Dehio Handbuch der deutschen Kunstdenkmäler Österreichs), Anton Schroll & Co., Vienna, 1938.
- Die Schulen von Ferrara, Bologna, Parma und Modena, der Lombardei, Genuas, Neapels und Siziliens mit einem Nachtrag zu allen italienischen Schulen. Series: Beschreibender Katalog der Handzeichnungen in der Albertina, vol. 6. A. Schroll, Vienna, 1941.
- Französische Phantastik: Sommerausstellung Albertina. Albertina, Vienna, 1946.
- Austrian Paintings throughout the Centuries. H. Bauer, Vienna, 1950.
- Kirchliche Architektur Österreichs durch die Jahrhunderte. Actien-Ges. d. Vöslauer Kammgarn-Fabrik, Bad Vöslau, 1953.
- Kunst aus Österreich. Europäische Meisterzeichnungen und Aquarelle. Actien-Ges. d. Vöslauer Kammgarn-Fabrik, Bad Vöslau, 1954.
- Kunst aus Österreich. Meisterwerke europäischer Malerei. Actien-Ges. d. Vöslauer Kammgarn-Fabrik, Bad Vöslau, 1955.
