= Heinrich von Lützow =

Austro-Hungarian diplomat

Heinrich von Lützow zu Drey-Lützow und Seedorf
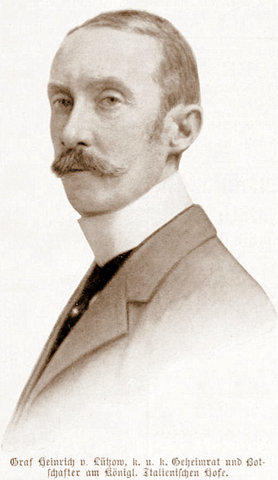

Austro-Hungarian Ambassador to Italy
- In office 7 March 1904 – 4 March 1910
- Preceded by: Marius Pasetti-Angeli von Friedenburg
- Succeeded by: Kajetan von Mérey

First Section Chief in the Imperial Foreign Ministry
- In office 1901–1904
- Succeeded by: Kajetan von Mérey

Second Section Chief in the Imperial Foreign Ministry
- In office 1899–1901
- Succeeded by: Kajetan von Mérey

Personal details
- Born: 16 January 1861 Baden bei Wien, Austria-Hungary
- Died: 8 November 1935 (aged 83) Vienna, Austria
- Spouse: Baroness Eleonore Tuyll van Serooskerken (m. 1879; died 1934)
- Relations: Francis Lützow (brother)
- Children: 3

Heinrich Joseph Rudolf Gottfried Graf von Lützow zu Drey-Lützow und Seedorf (11 September 1852 – 8 November 1935), was an Austro-Hungarian diplomat.

== Early life ==
Heinrich von Lützow was born on 11 September 1852 at Baden bei Wien. His parents were Franz von Lützow, Count of Tuppau and Sachsengrün (1814–1897) and his wife Henriette Seymour (1822–1909). His brother, Count Franz, died in London in 1881. His sister, Countess Rosa, married Prince Alfred zu Salm-Salm (younger brother of Prince Leopold zu Salm-Salm) in 1869.

He came from the Austro-Bohemian (Catholic) branch of the noble family of Lützow, originally from Mecklenburg, and was raised to the rank of Count in 1692. His maternal grandparents were Henry Augustus Seymour (an illegitimate son of the 2nd Marquess of Hertford) and Margaret Williams.

After graduating from the Schottengymnasium in Vienna in 1871, he joined the Austro-Hungarian Army and was appointed Lieutenant in the 1st Uhlan Regiment in 1872. In 1874 he entered the diplomatic service as a provisional attaché at the embassy in Stuttgart, from where he was transferred to the Austrian embassy in the Kingdom of Saxony in Dresden at the beginning of 1877 with the same rank. After passing the diplomatic examination with distinction, he was permanently accepted into the diplomatic service of Austria-Hungary in December 1877, even though he had not completed any studies.

== Career ==
Initially assigned to the legation in Brussels as legation attaché, he was transferred to the legation in The Hague in June 1879, where he met his wife. Because of the marriage, he was immediately transferred back to Brussels, then from May 1881 with the title of legation secretary to the embassy in Rome. In 1886, he was transferred to the embassy in London, appointed legation secretary there in 1887, and in 1891 he came to Paris as a legation councilor, until finally, on 4 December 1895, he was appointed "Extraordinary Envoy and Plenipotentiary Minister to the Royal Saxon Court in Dresden and the Grand Ducal and Ducal Saxon Courts, the Ducal Court of Anhalt and the Princely Schwarzburg and Reuss Houses" a function which, in contrast to the imposing nature of its title, was almost a sinecure, since the Austro-Hungarian embassy in Dresden served almost exclusively for protocol matters in the dealings of the Austrian and Saxon ruling houses and had no political functions whatsoever (these, of course, went through the Austro-Hungarian embassy to the German Empire in Berlin since 1871). Lützow used this position to establish important contacts and to prepare his further career, supported by the benevolent trust of his head of department, Count Agenor Maria Gołuchowski, the Austro-Hungarian Foreign Minister from 1895 to 1906.

In February 1897, he presided as Austria-Hungary's delegate at the International Sanitary Conference in Venice. At the end of 1899, he was recalled to the Foreign Ministry in Vienna as "Second Section Chief," appointed Privy Councilor ("Your Excellency"), and after just under two years, at the end of 1901, appointed "First Section Chief." This position entailed the supreme administrative leadership of the entire Foreign Ministry, and was thus comparable to that of a civil servant State Secretary.

On 7 March 1904, he was appointed "Extraordinary and Plenipotentiary Ambassador to the Royal Italian Court in Rome," a position he held until 4 March 1910, when he was recalled by the then Foreign Minister, Count Alois Lexa von Aehrenthal, and placed on hold in 1911. In 1913, he was placed on permanent retirement.

=== Later life ===
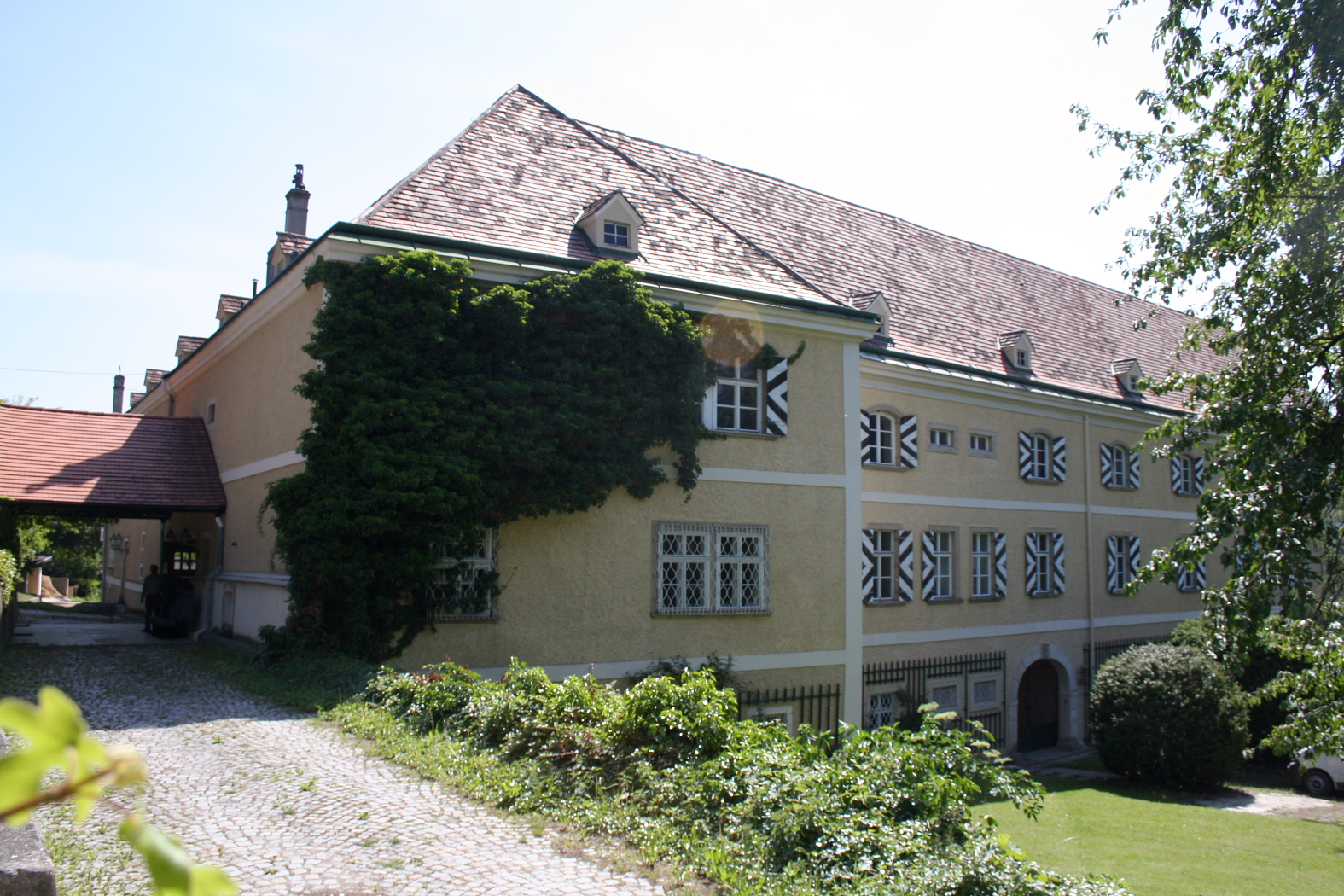
Strelzhof Castle

In addition to his diplomatic activities, Count Heinrich von Lützow was a life member of the House of Lords of the Austrian Imperial Council from 27 December 1909, and conscientiously fulfilled this role until the fall of the Habsburg monarchy in November 1918. He also held the socially influential position of President of the Vienna Jockey Club. However, he was forced to sell his country estate, Strelzhof Castle near the Schneeberg, to Credit Foncier Auxiliaire AG in Zurich in 1920.

== Personal life ==
On 27 November 1879, he married Baroness Eleonore Tuyll van Serooskerken (1855–1934) in Wassenaar, in the Dutch province of South Holland, on the western coast of the Netherlands north of The Hague. Together, the couple were the parents of three daughters, including:

- Countess Nora von Lützow (1891–1945), who married Count Karl Friedrich Maria Khuen von Belasi, Count of Khuen-Lützow, in Budapest in 1924.
- Countess Irene Amy Romola von Lützow (1884–1980), who married Count Adolf Oswald Dubsky von Trebomyslic.
- Countess Elsa von Lützow (1886–1974), who married Count Franz Johann Duclas von Thurn und Valsássina-Como-Vercelli in 1910.

His wife died on 17 October 1934 in Vienna. Count Heinrich survived her by a little over a year before his death there on 8 November 1935. His handwritten memoirs, which are particularly insightful regarding Austro-Hungarian politics, especially towards Italy and the Triple Alliance, were published in 1971.

Diplomatic posts
Preceded by	Second Section Chief in the Imperial Foreign Ministry; 1899–1901	Succeeded by Kajetan von Mérey
Preceded by	First Section Chief in the Imperial Foreign Ministry; 1901–1904	Succeeded by Kajetan von Mérey
Preceded by Marius Pasetti-Angeli von Friedenburg	Austro-Hungarian Ambassador to Italy; 1904–1910	Succeeded by Kajetan von Mérey
