= Military history of Finland =

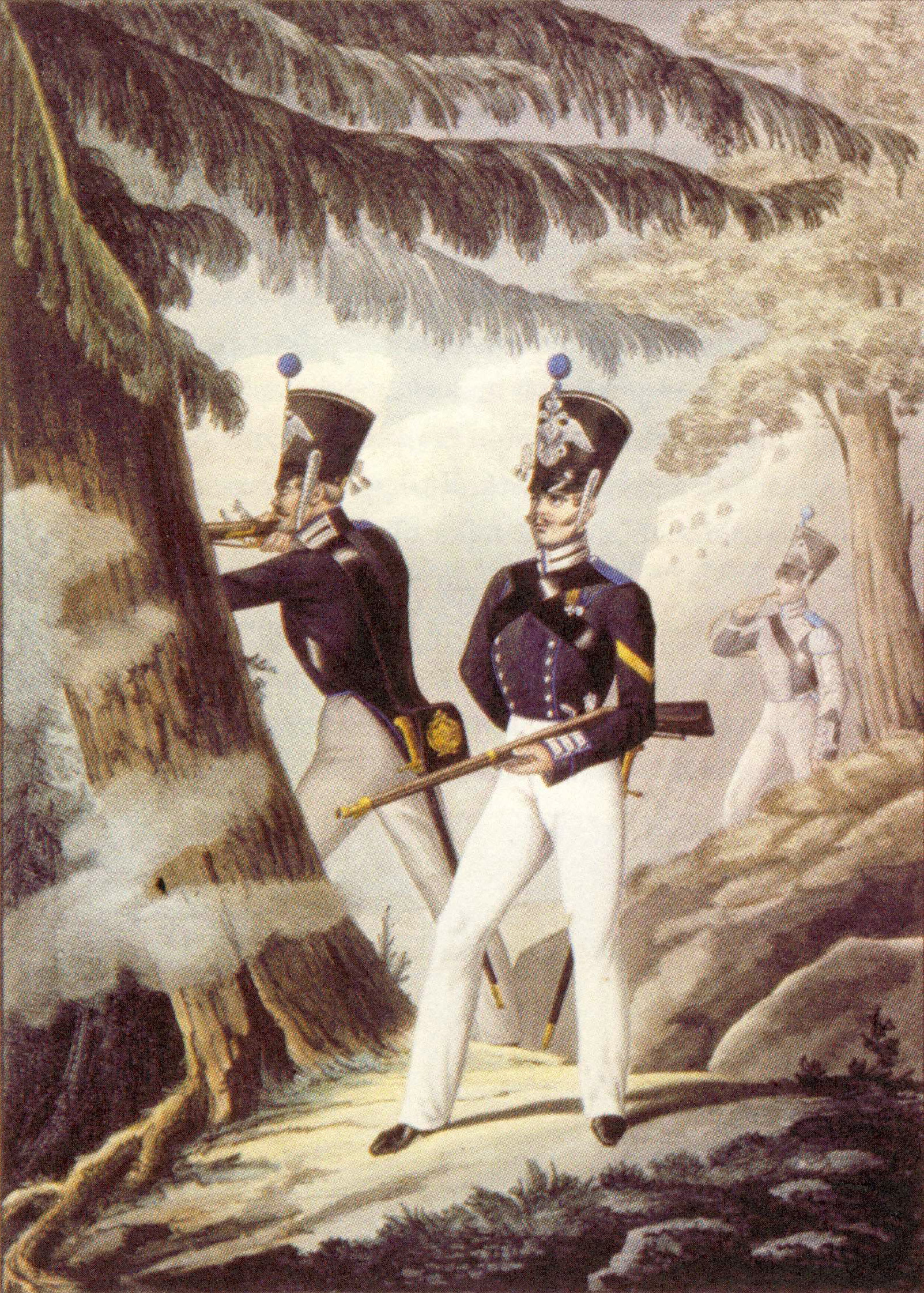
Members of the Finnish Guards' Rifle Battalion of the Grand Duchy of Finland, a Governorate-General of the Russian Empire, circa. 1830.

The military history of Finland consists of hundreds of years of armed actions in the territory encompassing modern Finland.

== Prehistory ==
Finland was first settled around 8300 BC, immediately after the last ice age. Archaeological evidence of prehistoric warfare is largely incomplete, primarily because prehistoric skeletons, which might bear traces of violent traumas, rarely survive in the Finnish soil. From the Bronze Age (1500–500 BC) onwards, improved weapons, such as battle-axes and swords, are included in the archaeological record. There is also evidence of hill-forts from the same time period. Weapons are common finds from the Roman Iron Age (1 A.D. – 400 A.D.) onwards.

== Middle Ages ==
Viking attacks on Finland are indicated only by a couple of runic inscriptions in Sweden, as well as some uncertain saga sources. According to one saga, Olaf the Holy, later a King of Norway, made an attack on a country that has often been interpreted as south-western Finland around the years 1007/8. He was defeated in the Battle at Herdaler.

Before the 14th century Finnish history is very poorly documented. However, archaeological evidence, for example hill-forts, suggests that the 12th and 13th centuries were relatively restless, as Sweden and the Russian state of Novgorod were slowly spreading their dominance in Northeastern Europe. The Swedish kingdom championed Roman Catholic Christianity, whereas Novgorod was an Eastern Orthodox state. Several raids and attacks against the Finns are mentioned in Russian chronicles during the 12th and 13th centuries. Both Swedes and Danes made offensives against the Finns. These operations were dubbed as "Crusades" in later historiography.

According to the Icelandic Egil's Saga, the Norse and the (Northern) Fennic people united their forces, apparently during the 12th century, against attacks by the Karelians who—with the assistance of Novgorod (part of today's Russia)—made advances towards Northern Finland and Norway.

According to some sources, the Karelians destroyed the Swedish town of Sigtuna in 1187.

In 1251 the Finnish Karelians again fought against the Norwegians, and in 1271 the two Finnish peoples, the Kvens and the Karelians, cooperated in wars and battles against the Norwegians in Hålogaland (Haalogaland).

== Finland as a part of Sweden ==
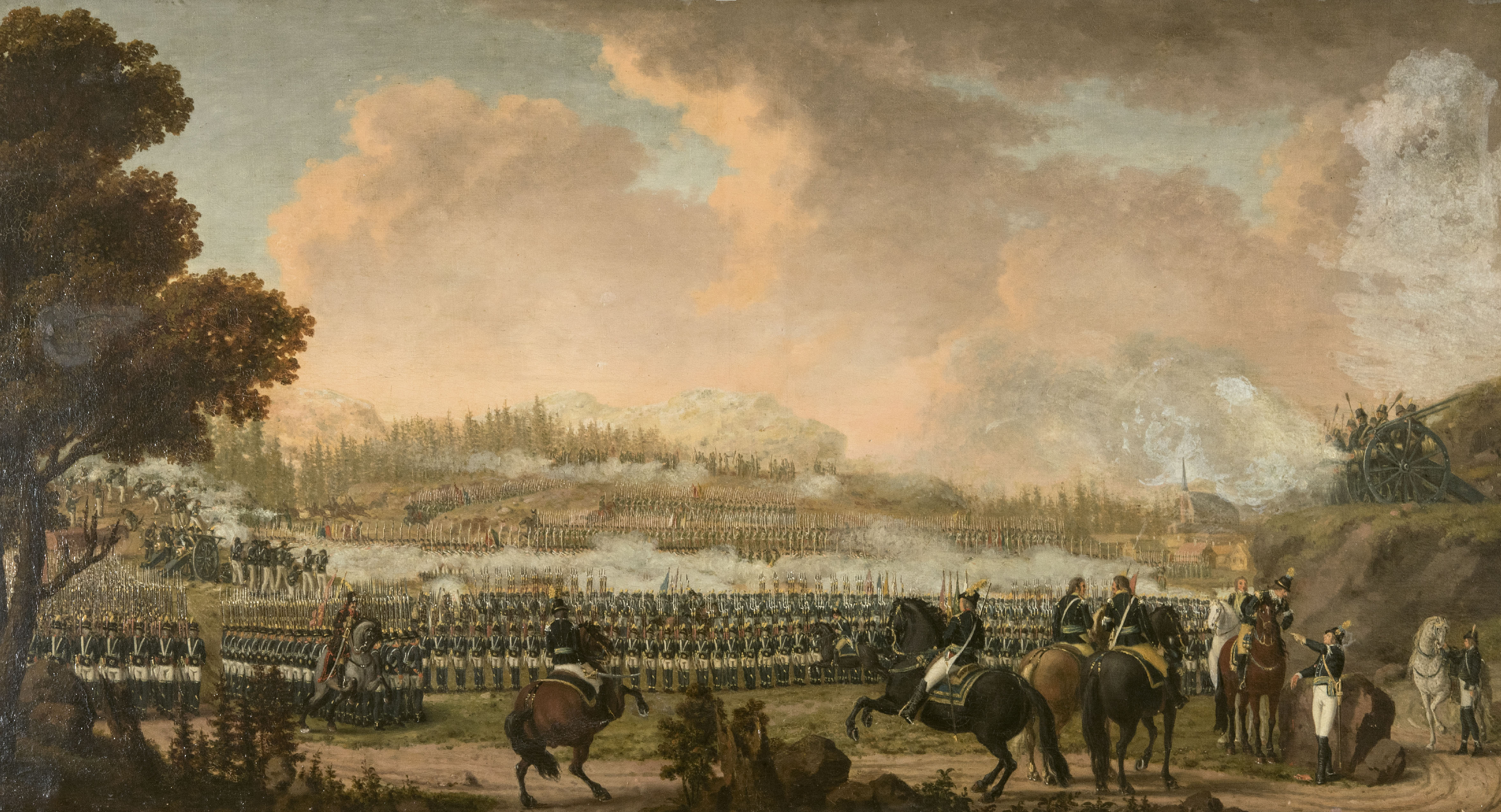
The Battle of Valkeala in 1790 took place in Valkeala, Finland, between Sweden and the Russian Empire. At the time, Finland was a component of the Swedish Realm.

During the several following centuries, a gradual and slow process of Swedish expansion in today's Finland and the consolidation of Sweden took place, not through wars fought between the Finns and the Swedes, but rather by various levels of wars and skirmishes between the Finns themselves, others—in the west, such as the people of Häme—sympathising with the Catholic Swedes, and others—in the eastern parts, particularly the Karelians—cooperating with the Orthodox Russians.

Furthermore, during the first several centuries of the Swedish expansion to the traditional lands of the Finns—up to the 16th century and beyond—only the south-western parts of the area known today as Finland (then the lands of the Finns reached also beyond today's borders of the Republic of Finland) had been reached by the Swedish expansion and thus had become part of the Swedish realm.

From 1323 until 1809, Finland was officially an integral part of the Swedish Realm, including first only the south-western lands inhabited by the Finns but expanding east as time went by.

Finnish soldiers fought in at least 38 known wars of Sweden, all of them having something to do with either power struggles within the Swedish royal family or struggles between Sweden and other nations.

== Grand Duchy of Finland ==
As a result of the so-called Finnish War of 1808–1809 Finland became an autonomous Grand Duchy of Finland in the Russian Empire until Finland's declaration of independence on December 6, 1917. During that period the Finnish army participated in the wars of Russia, such as the Crimean War—during which, in 1855, the French and the British navies attacked Finland—and the First World War.

== Republic of Finland ==
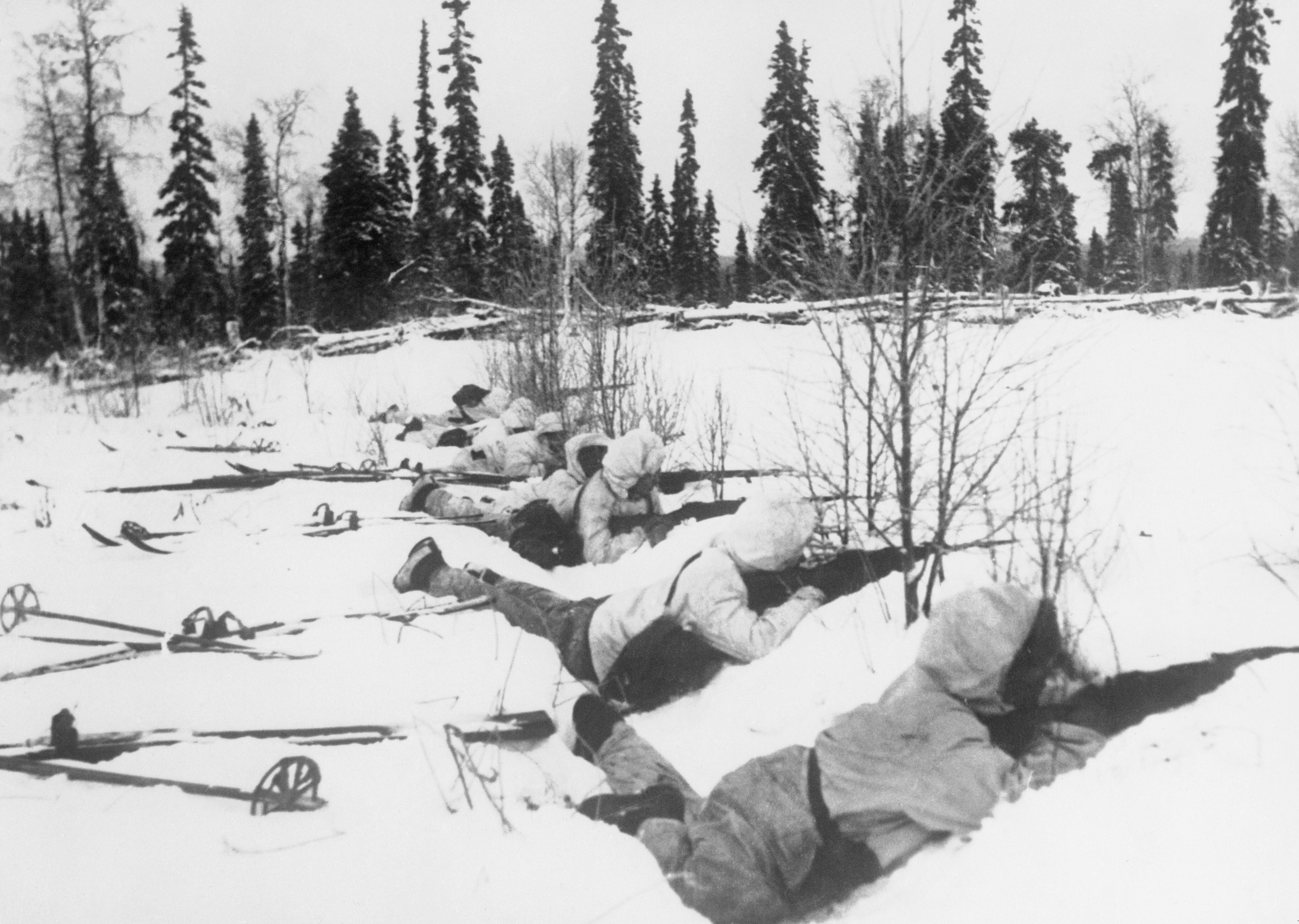
Finnish ski troops in Northern Finland in January 1940, during the Winter War.

From 1917 on Finland has been an independent republic. This period started with the Finnish Civil War in 1918, between the Reds (communists) and the Whites (mixed right wing, liberal and centrist groups allied against the Reds), soon after Finland's declaration of independence. The former were supported by Bolshevik Russia, and the latter by the German Empire. The Whites eventually defeated the Reds.

=== World War II ===
The Soviet Union invaded Finland on 30 November 1939, starting the Winter War, with the goal of annexing Finland. An expected easy Soviet victory instead saw the Red Army suffer severe losses in men and materiel, and the attempt to conquer Finland failed. The war ended on 13 March 1940 with the signing of the Moscow Peace Treaty in which Finland ceded 9% of its territory to the Soviet Union.

Finland invaded the Soviet Union in June 1941, initiating the Continuation War. Finland retook territory lost in the Winter War and proceeded to occupy East Karelia. The Soviets launched the Vyborg–Petrozavodsk offensive in June 1944 and drove Finland out of the territory it had taken, but the Finns halted the offensive with a string of victories, beginning with the Battle of Tali-Ihantala and ending with the Battle of Ilomantsi in August 1944. The Continuation War ended with the Moscow Armistice.

As part of the Moscow Armistice, Finland was obliged to drive out the Germans from Finnish territory, in what became the Lapland War. The war ended in April 1945.

The Finns successfully resisted Soviet attempts to conquer Finland, making Finland one of two combatant continental European countries in World War II not to have its capital occupied (the other being the Soviet Union).

=== Post World War II ===
Soon after the birth of the United Nations, Finnish military troops—including various types of military personnel and advisers—started participating in many UN peacekeeping operations, beginning in 1956 with the United Nations Emergency Force at the Suez Crisis. Defense strategy in Finland after World War II required tact and diplomacy. In the event of major hostilities, The Finnish Defence Forces basically needed to hold off attackers and establish an evacuation corridor, most likely to the West, just long enough for the population center in the areas surrounding the capital to evacuate to safety. Because it was not clear from which direction troops might come during the Cold War, it was necessary to train for all possibilities without antagonizing NATO, the Soviet Union, or neighboring countries.

In response to the 2022 Russian invasion of Ukraine, Finland announced that it would apply to join the NATO military alliance, ending its postwar policy of neutrality. Finland joined NATO on April 4, 2023.

== See also ==
- List of wars involving Finland
- Finnish–Estonian defense cooperation
- Military history of Denmark
- Military history of Iceland
- Military history of Norway
- Military history of Sweden
