= Jaakko Forsman =

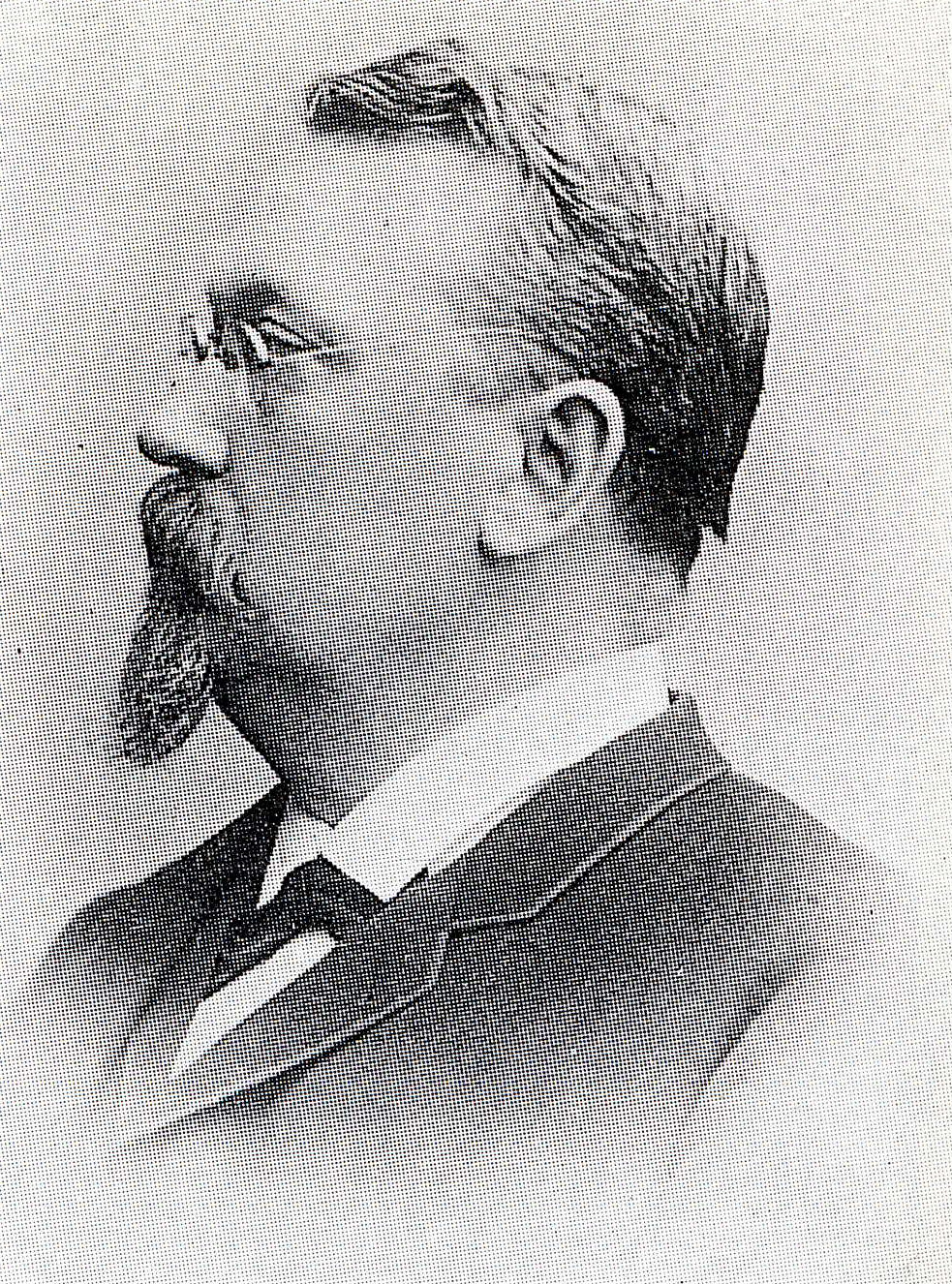
Portrait of Jaakko

Jaakko Forsman (30 July 1839, Vähäkyrö — 26 September 1899, Helsinki) was a Finnish jurist and politician, as well as a leading activist of the Fennoman movement.

In 1857, he attained his doctorate in law at the University of Helsinki with the first Finnish language dissertation ever submitted to the Faculty of Law there. In 1879, he was appointed professor of law and legal history. He was acting rector of the university from 1896 to 1899.

His contributions to the 1889 Finnish Criminal Code and his lectures in criminal law, which came to be regarded as the code's authentic interpretation, earned him the title of "Father of Finnish Criminal Law". Forsman also wrote a seminal text on Finnish legal history, Suomen lainsäädännön historia (1896), and served in the Diet of Finland from 1882 until his death.

== Publications ==
- Pakko-tilasta kriminalioikeudessa (1874)
- Grunderna för läran om delaktighet i brott (1879)
- Lisiä 1885 vuoden säädyille annetun rikoslain-ehdotuksen tarkastamiseksi (1885)
- Bidrag till läran om skadestånd i brottmål enligt finsk rätt (1893)
- Suomen lainsäädännön historia (1896)
- Anteckningar enligt professor Jaakko Forsmans föreläsningar öfver de särskilda brotten, enligt strafflagen af den 19 december 1889 (1899)
- Redogörelse för Kejserliga Alexanders-universitetet i Finland under läseåren 1896-1899 (1899)
- Yliopistollisia puheita ja kutsumus yliopiston kruunausjuhlaan 18 2/11 96 (1899)
- Anteckningar enligt professor Jaakko Forsmans föreläsningar öfver straffrättens allmänna läror med särskild hänsyn till strafflagen af den 19 december 1889 (1900)

Educational offices
Preceded by Thiodolf Rein	Rector of Imperial Alexander University; 1896–1899	Succeeded by Edvard Hjelt
