= Edvard Hjelt =

Finnish chemist and politician (1855–1921)

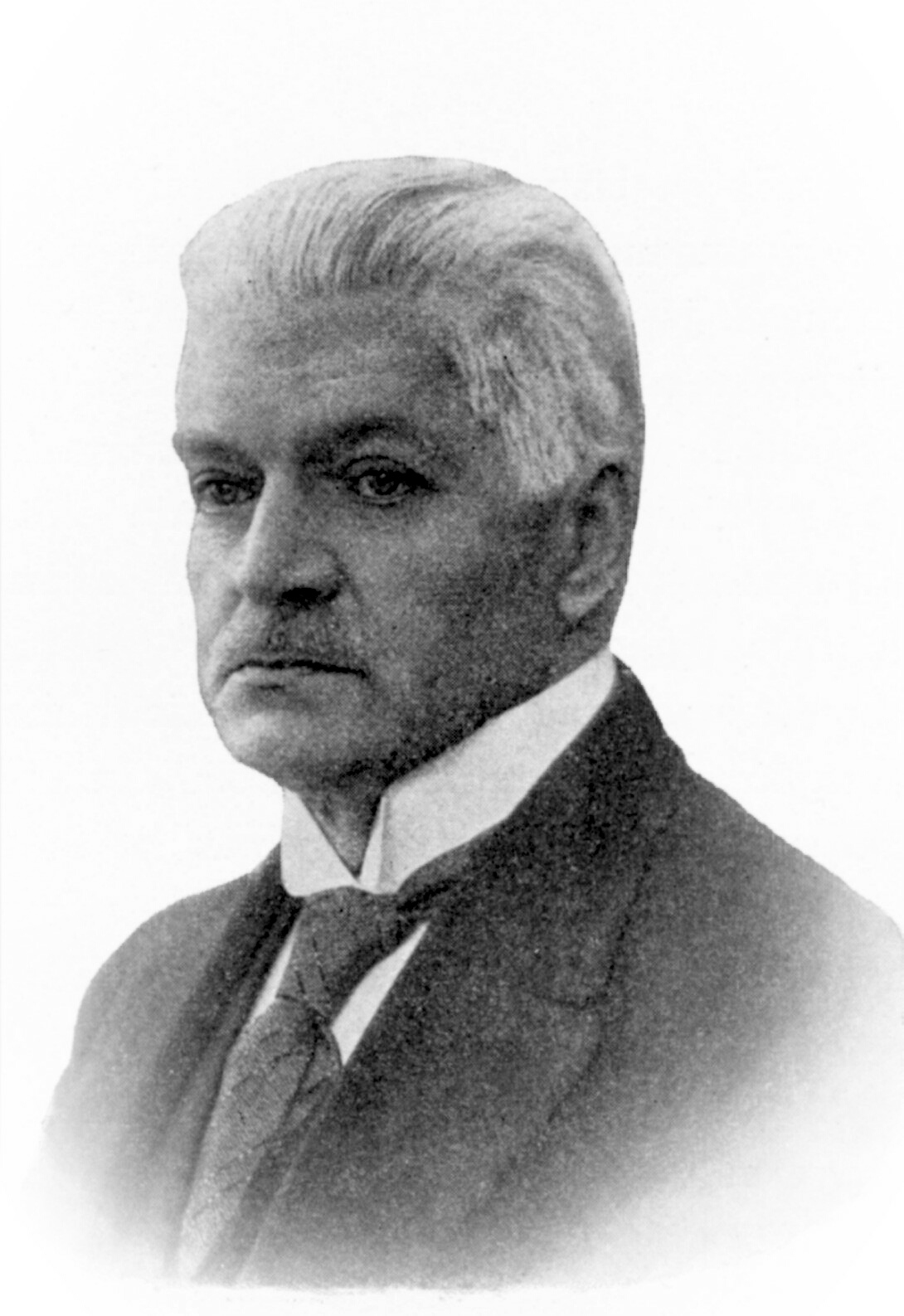
- Born: 28 June 1855; Vihti, Finland
- Died: 2 July 1921 (aged 66); Bad Mergentheim, Germany
- Education: Imperial Alexander University in Finland
- Scientific career
- Fields: Chemistry

Edvard Immanuel Hjelt (28 June 1855 – 2 July 1921) was a Finnish chemist, politician and a member of the Senate of Finland. Hjelt studied chemistry in Finland and in Germany and became rector of the Imperial Alexander University in Finland in 1899. He opposed the increasing influence of Russia in the Grand Duchy of Finland and started his career in politics. Good connections to Germany created during his chemistry studies before and after his graduation made it possible for him to get military help during the Finnish Civil War. Hjelt organized the training of the Finnish Jäger troops in Germany.

== Early life and education ==
Hjelt was born in Vihti, Finland. He was the elder brother of August Hjelt. He studied chemistry at the Imperial Alexander University in Finland, and, like most of the chemists of the 19th century, went abroad to improve his education. From 1877 until 1878, he first studied with Johannes Wislicenus at the University of Würzburg, in 1879 with Emil Fischer, Emil Erlenmeyer and Adolf von Baeyer at the Ludwig-Maximilians-Universität München. After returning to Helsinki, he received his Ph.D., but Hjelt needed a second thesis to become a university professor. After another research stay in Germany at the University of Strasbourg, working with Rudolph Fittig, he prepared that second thesis and became professor for organic chemistry at the Imperial Alexander University in Finland.

== University rector ==
Hjelt served as vice rector of the Imperial Alexander University in Finland from 1896 until 1899 and as rector from 1899 until 1917. The political turmoil after the announcement of the February Manifesto of 1899 by Russian Emperor Nicholas II, which was meant to start a Russification of Finland and tie the Grand Duchy of Finland closer to the Russian Empire, induced student demonstrations. The Russian authorities, especially the Finnish Minister Secretary of State Vyacheslav von Plehve and the Governor-General of Finland Nikolay Bobrikov, had to deal with the reactions of the people. Hjelt was able to reduce the pressure on the students and the university and also to stop aggressive reaction of the students to the oppression. With a short relieve after the defeat in the Russo-Japanese War the oppression continued.

== Political career ==
With the start of the First World War Hjeld saw a chance to gain independence from Russia after a defeat of Russia by Germany. Germany on the other hand would benefit from troop withdrawal from the frontline to deal with a Finnish uprising. His good relations with Germany allowed Hjelt to get in contact with leading military personnel to negotiate a German support for Finland. A small group of Finnish volunteers reached Germany via Sweden in 1915. Their training started in autumn 1915; at the end, the group of 2,000 men formed the 27th Jäger Battalion. This unit was the core of the Finnish White Guard during the Finnish Civil War (January to May 1918). On November 26, 1917 Hjelt, together with Adolf von Bonsdorff, met with General Erich Ludendorff and Marshal Paul von Hindenburg at the German army headquarters at Kreuznach to get more help for the coming civil war. Six German battalions landed in Hanko and helped the Finnish army to drive the Red Guards from most of their strongholds.

Hjelt signed a peace treaty between Germany and Finland in Berlin on 7 March 1918. After the end of the civil war he signed a peace treaty with Austria-Hungary. He also searched for a king in the new, planned monarchy of Finland. His first suggestion was Adolf Friedrich, Duke of Mecklenburg-Schwerin, but after Prussian opposition Prince Frederick Charles of Hesse was chosen to become the King of Finland. After the victory of the Allied powers the idea of a monarchy was dropped and Kaarlo Juho Ståhlberg became first president of Finland.

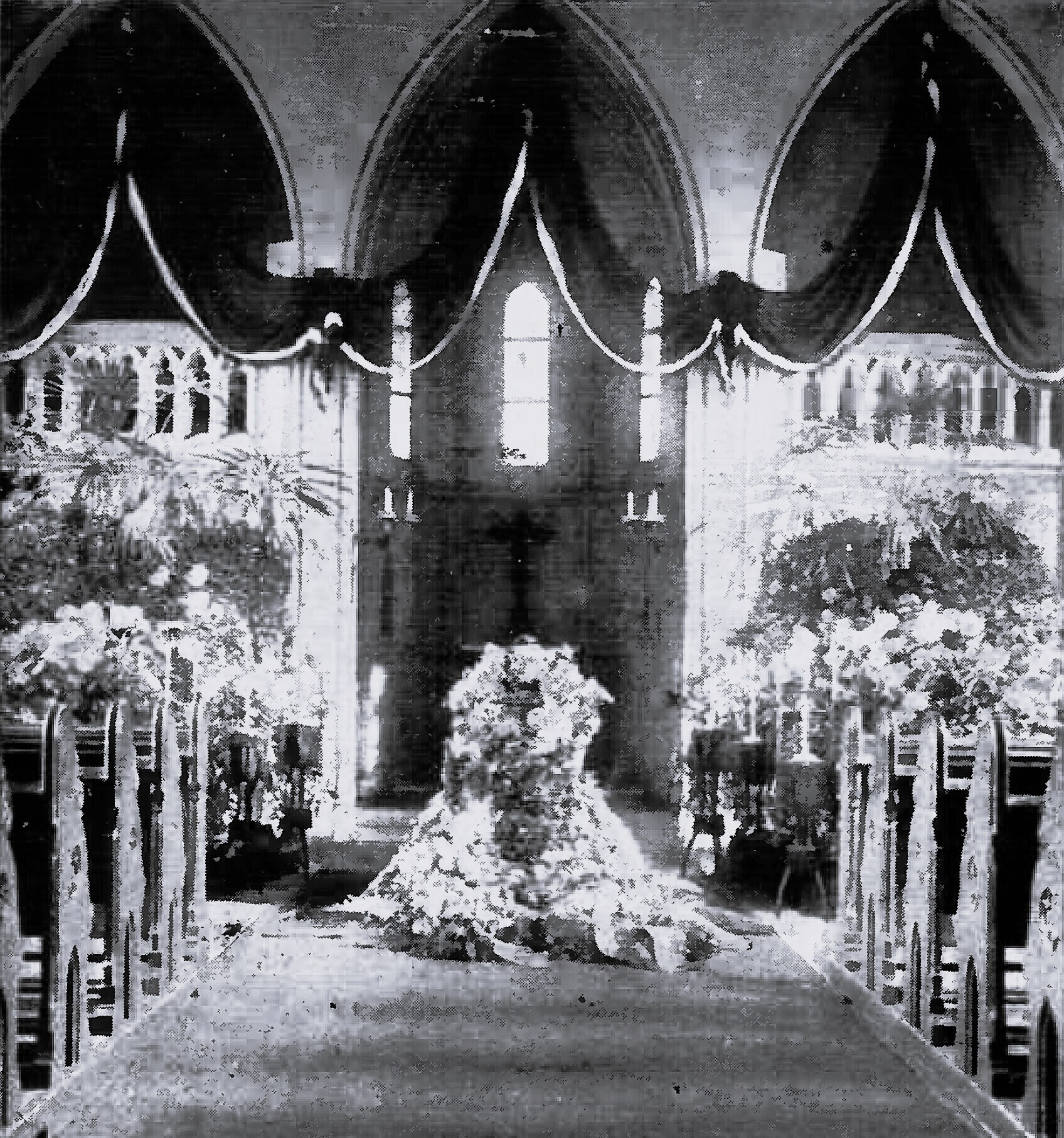
Laying out of the State Council in the chapel of the in Lübeck.

Hjelt's strong connections to Germany and his animosity against France, made him no longer suitable as diplomat after the First World War, in which Germany lost most of its influence to France, the United States and Great Britain.

== Works ==
- Geschichte der organischen Chemie von der ältesten Zeit bis zur Gegenwart : mit 3 Figuren . Vieweg, Braunschweig 1916 Digital edition by the University and State Library Düsseldorf

== Publications ==
- Nils Nilson Idman, en finsk språk- och fornforskare under förra seklet (1882)
- Erik Lencqvist, en finsk präst och häfdeforskare i föregående århundradet (1886)
- Sveriges ställning till utlandet närmast efter 1772 års statshvälfning (1887)
- Yleisen valtiotiedon opas kansalaisille (1889)
- Nystads jernvägsfråga (1891)
- Sjuk-, begrafnings- och pensionskassor för arbetare och handtverkare i Finland (1891)
- Tapaturmat työssä Suonien eri ammateissa ynnä vertailuja Ruotsin, Norjan ja Saksan tapaturmaoloihin (1892)
- Die Arbeiter-Versicherung in Finnland (1899)
- De första officiela relationerna om svenska tabellverket åren 1749-1757 (1900)
- Det svenska tabellverkets uppkomst, organisation och tidigare verksamhet (1900)
- Rösträtten i Bondeståndet och inkomstförhållandena på landsbygden (1902)
- Rösträttsförhållandena i Borgareståndet och deras reformering (1902)
- Släkten Hjelt(1903)
- Den kommunala inkomstbeskattningen och inkomstförhållandena i Finland (1904-1905)

Educational offices
Preceded by Jaakko Forsman	Rector of Imperial Alexander University; 1899–1905	Succeeded by Rabbe Axel Wrede
Preceded by Rabbe Axel Wrede	Rector of Imperial Alexander University; 1905–1907	Succeeded by Ivar Heikel
