= Kajetan von Mérey =

Austro-Hungarian diplomat

Kajetan Mérey von Kapos-Mére
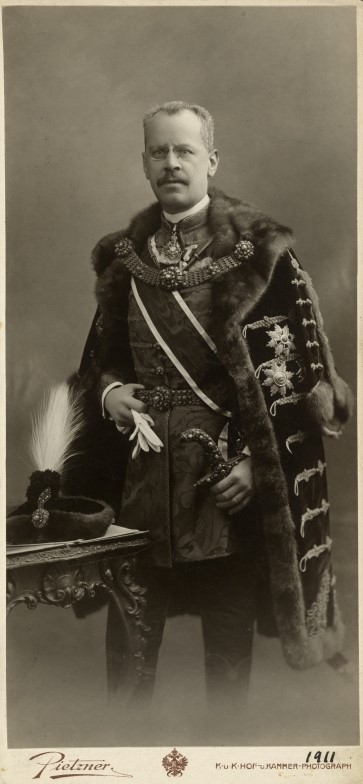

Second Section Chief in the Imperial Foreign Ministry
- In office 29 November 1901 – 11 March 1904
- Preceded by: Heinrich Graf von Lützow zu Drey-Lützow und Seedorf
- Succeeded by: Ladislaus Müller von Szentgyörgy

First Section Chief in the Imperial Foreign Ministry
- In office 11 February 1904 – 26 February 1907
- Preceded by: Heinrich Graf von Lützow zu Drey-Lützow und Seedorf
- Succeeded by: Guido Freiherr von Call zu Rosenburg und Kulmbach

Austro-Hungarian Ambassador to Italy
- In office 4 March 1910 – 23 May 1915
- Preceded by: Heinrich Graf von Lützow zu Drey-Lützow und Seedorf
- Succeeded by: None

Personal details
- Born: 16 January 1861 Vienna, Austria-Hungary (now Austria)
- Died: 2 February 1931 (aged 70) Vienna, Austria

Kajetan Mérey von Kapos-Mére (Hungarian: kapos-mérei Mérey Kajetán) (16 January 1861 – 2 February 1931), was an Austro-Hungarian diplomat of Hungarian origin serving as ambassador at Rome at the outbreak of World War I.

== Life ==
Kajetan von Mérey was born in Vienna on 16 January 1861 into a family who belongs to the lower echelons of the Hungarian nobility as son of banking expert Alexander von Mérey von Kapos-Mére (1834–1927).

Educated at the Theresian Military Academy, he was commissioned as a lieutenant in 1883 but after successfully passing the entrance exam for the diplomatic corps in 1885, he was dispatched as attaché to Belgrade and then the following year to Bucharest. In 1891, he was sent to serve at the embassy in Paris and then to Constantinople (now Istanbul) in 1893.

In 1895, von Mérey was selected by Count Goluchowski to serve as deputy chef de cabinet, but was promoted already the same year to chef de cabinet. In 1899, he served as a member of the Austro-Hungarian delegation to the First Hague Peace Conference. In 1903, he was appointed a Privy Councillor (Geheimer Rat). In March 1904, he was nominated to the post of First Section Chief in the Foreign Ministry but was relieved in February 1907 and appointed Austro-Hungarian chief delegate to the Second Hague Peace Conference.

On 4 March 1910, von Mérey was selected by Count Lexa von Aehrenthal to succeed Count von Lützow as ambassador at the Italian Royal Court. Known for his great intelligence and precision as well as for being hard-working and well-informed, qualities that had made him indispensable at the Ballhausplatz, he was, however, somewhat less well placed for this new posting. Considered rather cold and austere, he often left the impression in the eyes of his contemporaries of a "pedantic, tactless, and ill-humoured bureaucrat". Although impressed by the southern lifestyle, he lacked the ease and affable charm of his predecessor and thus failed to capture the sympathy of the Italians. Well aware of the difficult and complex relationship between Austria-Hungary and Italy, he tried, however, to improve the relations. In the disputes between Count Lexa von Aehrenthal and General Conrad von Hötzendorf, the Chief of the General Staff, he took the latter's side but found his position increasingly untenable after Count Berchtold became Imperial Foreign Minister in 1912. During the Balkan crisis in 1912/1913, he saw the storm on the horizon and sent warnings to Vienna of an imminent armed conflict.

Upon hearing of the assassination of Archduke Franz Ferdinand in Sarajevo in June 1914, he suffered a nervous breakdown. During this critical moment, there was little time to lose and Count Berchtold therefore dispatched his First Section Chief Baron von Macchio to assume von Mérey's duties. Baron von Macchio arrived on 11 August to Rome and served in this capacity until the Italian declaration of war on 23 May 1915, although he never officially replaced him. He retired on 2 November 1918.

After his return to Vienna he took over the Italian department at the Foreign Ministry and was appointed in December 1917 to lead the Austro-Hungarian delegation that signed the armistice with Russia and then negotiated the Treaty of Brest-Litovsk, signed on 3 March 1918. He was a negotiator of the Treaty of Peace between Austria-Hungary and Finland, signed in Vienna on 29 May 1918.

Playing no further role after the war, von Mérey died in Vienna on 2 February 1931.

Diplomatic posts
Preceded by Heinrich Graf von Lützow zu Drey-Lützow und Seedorf	Second Section Chief in the Imperial Foreign Ministry; 1901–1904	Succeeded by Ladislaus Müller von Szentgyörgy
Preceded by Heinrich Graf von Lützow zu Drey-Lützow und Seedorf	First Section Chief in the Imperial Foreign Ministry; 1904–1907	Succeeded by Guido Freiherr von Call zu Rosenburg und Kulmbach
Preceded by Heinrich Graf von Lützow zu Drey-Lützow und Seedorf	Austro-Hungarian Ambassador to Italy; 1910–1915	Succeeded by None
