= Stephan Burián von Rajecz =

Austro-Hungarian politician (1851–1922)

Count Stephan Burián von Rajecz
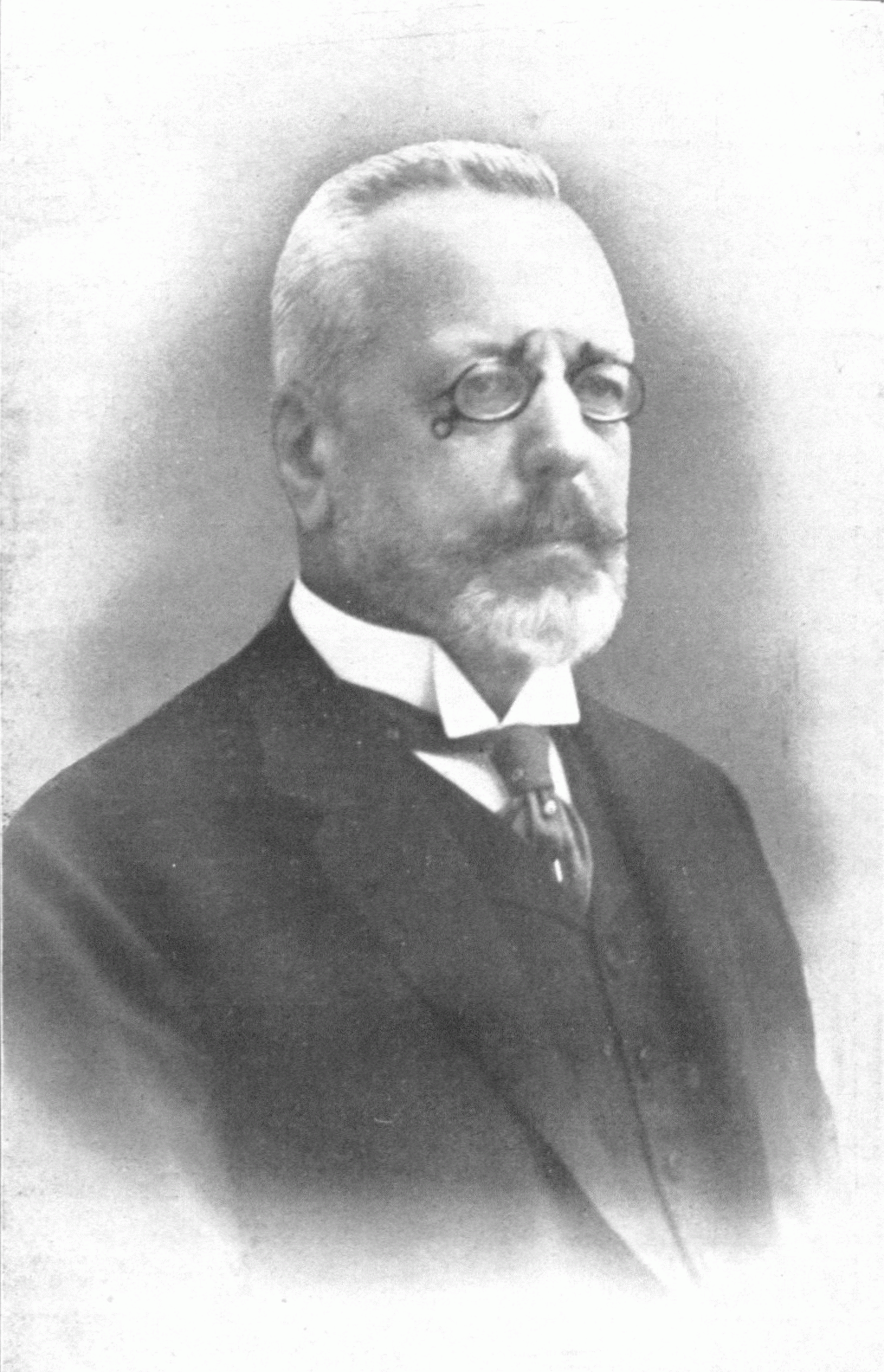

Austro-Hungarian Consul General to Bulgaria
- In office 4 May 1887 – 5 November 1895
- Preceded by: Rüdiger Freiherr von Biegeleben
- Succeeded by: Guido Freiherr von Call zu Rosenburg und Kulmbach

Austro-Hungarian Minister to Württemberg
- In office 24 June 1896 – 16 February 1897
- Preceded by: Theodor Graf Zichy zu Zich und von Vásonykeö
- Succeeded by: Siegfried Graf von Clary und Aldringen

Austro-Hungarian Minister to Greece
- In office 16 February 1897 – 24 July 1903
- Preceded by: Gustav Freiherr von Kosjek
- Succeeded by: Karl Freiherr von Macchio

Joint Finance Minister of Austria-Hungary
- In office 24 July 1903 – 20 February 1912
- Preceded by: Agenor Graf Gołuchowski von Gołuchowo
- Succeeded by: Leon Ritter von Biliński

Minister besides the King of Hungary
- In office 10 June 1913 – 13 January 1915
- Preceded by: László Lukács de Erzsébetváros
- Succeeded by: Count István Tisza de Borosjenő et Szeged

Joint Foreign Minister of Austria-Hungary
- In office 13 January 1915 – 22 December 1916
- Preceded by: Leopold Graf Berchtold von und zu Ungarschitz, Frättling und Püllütz
- Succeeded by: Ottokar Graf Czernin von und zu Chudenitz

Joint Finance Minister of Austria-Hungary
- In office 22 December 1916 – 7 September 1918
- Preceded by: Konrad Prinz zu Hohenlohe-Schillingsfürst
- Succeeded by: Alexander Freiherr von und zu Spitzmüller-Harmersbach

Joint Foreign Minister of Austria-Hungary
- In office 16 April 1918 – 24 October 1918
- Preceded by: Ottokar Graf Czernin von und zu Chudenitz
- Succeeded by: Julius Graf Andrássy von Csíkszentkirály und Krasznahorka

Member of the House of Magnates
- In office 25 February 1913 – 16 November 1918

Personal details
- Born: 16 January 1851 Stomfa, Kingdom of Hungary, Austrian Empire (now Stupava Slovakia)
- Died: 20 October 1922 (aged 71) Vienna, Austria
- Spouse(s): Olga, née Freiin Fejérváry von Komlós-Keresztes (1861–1931)

Count Stephan Burián von Rajecz (Hungarian: rajeczi gróf Burián István; 16 January 1851 – 20 October 1922), commonly called: "Baron von Burian" or, later, "Count Burian" in English language press reports; (titles from 1900, Freiherr; from 1918, Graf; titles abolished in 1919) was an Austro-Hungarian politician, diplomat and statesman of Hungarian origin and served as Imperial Foreign Minister during World War I.

== Life ==
=== Career ===
Stephan Burián von Rajecz was born in Stomfa, Kingdom of Hungary (now Stupava, Slovakia) on 16 January 1851 into an ancient Hungarian noble family. In 1891, he married Olga née Freiin Fejérváry von Komlós-Keresztes (1861–1931), a daughter of General Géza Freiherr Fejérváry von Komlós-Keresztes, who briefly served as Hungarian Minister-President.

Burián entered the consular branch of the Austro-Hungarian foreign service following graduation from the Consular Academy. He subsequently served in Alexandria, Bucharest, Belgrade and Sofia. From 1882 to 1886 he headed the Consulate General in Moscow before being appointed as consul general in Sofia from 1887 to 1895, then served as minister in Stuttgart from 1896 to 1897 and in Athens from 1897 to 1903, which won him a reputation of a Balkan expert. In 1900, he was raised to the rank of Baron.

In July 1903, Baron Burián was appointed by Emperor Franz Joseph I to serve as Joint Finance Minister of Austria-Hungary, replacing the deceased Benjamin Kállay von Nagy-Kálló who had held the post since 1882. While the Imperial Finance Ministry only was responsible for the financing of common aspects of the Dual Monarchy, i.e. the Foreign Policy, the Army and the Navy), the administration of the Condominium of Bosnia and Herzegovina fell under his responsibility following the annexation in 1908. Burián administered the two territories with a relatively mild hand and attempted to provide the population with a greater voice in the imperial administration. His conciliatory approach, however, failed to calm the country and only earned him the wrath of fellow bureaucrats. Burián left the post in February 1912 as he was finding it increasingly difficult to reconcile the various factions.

In June 1913, Baron Burián was appointed minister besides the King of Hungary, i.e. the Hungarian minister to the Court of Vienna, the closest connection between the Court of Vienna and Budapest. In his position of Hungarian emissary to Vienna, he successfully mediated between Foreign Minister Count Leopold Berchtold and the Hungarian Minister-President Count István Tisza during the July Crisis.

=== World War I ===
In January 1915, Austro-Hungarian Foreign Minister Count Berchtold was pressured by Germany to make territorial concessions to Italy as the price of securing that country's neutrality. When he acquiesced to the German proposal, he was forced from office on 13 January by hardliners. Baron Burián's name was put forward by Count Tisza, who was a close friend and ally, as Berchtold's successor which was accepted, albeit reluctantly, by Emperor Franz Joseph.

Baron Burián intended to increase the prestige of the monarchy and to get parity with Germany but also to negotiate peace with the help of the United States. (He would fail in the latter, after Germany announced in 1916 that it intended to start full submarine warfare, leading the US to prepare for war.)

A relative moderate, he initially resisted German pressure for territorial concessions as the price of maintaining Italy's neutrality, although he somewhat vacillated towards the end as Austro-Hungarian forces suffered a crushing defeat with the surrender of Przemysl in March. This did nothing, however, to prevent Italy from joining the Entente in May 1915 and declaring war. Considered a protégé of Count Tisza, he proved to be much steadfast in resisting German pressure as regards territorial concessions to Romania at the cost of Hungary. This led to Romania entering the side of the Entente in August 1916. Baron Burián resisted the plan to offer vast amounts of territory to Bulgaria but he did win Bulgaria to the side of the Central Powers in October 1915 and provided for stronger ties with the Ottoman Empire.

Baron Burián insisted that Germany treat Austria-Hungary as an equal in all military, economic and political activism, which only antagonised German opinion. He opposed Germany's policy of unrestricted submarine warfare, insisted on retention of Austro-Hungarian control on the Balkan front and demanded recognition of Austro-Hungarian interests in Poland. However, he increasingly lacked the material resources to back up his claims for equality with Germany. He further angered Germany and its military leaders by proposing a peace plan that called for the re-establishment of a free Belgium and the return of all captured French territory in exchange for recognition of German and Austro-Hungarian rights in Eastern Europe. As a result of this peace proposal, he was forced to resign in December 1916, which reflected the extent of German control over imperial policy. He was replaced by Count Ottokar Czernin and returned to serve as Imperial Finance Minister.

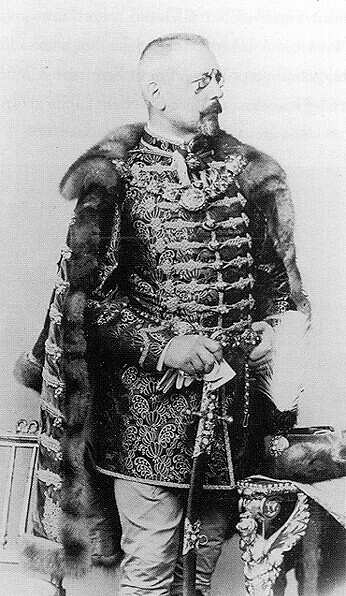
Baron Burián in 1896

Following the Sixtus Affair, the position of Count Czernin had become untenable and on 15 April 1918, Baron Burián was recalled by Emperor Charles I to serve as imperial foreign minister again, with instructions to negotiate an end to the war on favorable terms. Burián sought a compromise peace settlement, a course he had consistently advocated, but the deteriorating military situation of Austria-Hungary provided him little margin for manoeuvre facing increasing disputes with the German ally. He signed the peace treaty with Finland on 29 May 1918 in Vienna.

On 14 September 1918, Baron Burián issued a public appeal for all nations to end the war by diplomatic negotiations. On 5 October, he and the German Chancellor requested President Wilson's participation in peace negotiations on the basis of the Fourteen Points. Within weeks, he recognized the weak state of the Austro-Hungarian Army and that Germany would not agree to the unconditional surrender demanded by the Allies. He resigned from office on 24 October, realising that nothing could prevent the dissolution of Austria-Hungary. He was succeeded by Count Gyula Andrássy the Younger and thus became the penultimate Foreign Minister of the Dual Monarchy. For his services, Burián was elevated to the rank of Count (Graf) in 1918.

=== Post-war ===
Count Burián took no active part in diplomacy or politics after the war and spent his remaining years writing his war memoirs, which were published posthumously in German as Drei Jahre aus der Zeit meiner Amtsfuhrung im Kriege in 1923. The English language version, Austria in dissolution; being the personal recollections of Stephan, count Burian, was translated by Brian Lunn, and was published in 1925.

Count Burián died on 20 October 1922 and is buried at the Vienna Central Cemetery.

==== Legacy ====
During the war, Count Burián had sought to balance several sometimes conflicting demands; winning the war, preserving the Austria-Hungary's status and defending Hungary's position within the Dual Monarchy. Certainly a task that was nothing short of overwhelming. Considered to be serious, legalistic and unimaginative, personal traits that made him a good fit for the bureaucracy and the Imperial Cabinet. However, his rigidity and pedantry likely made him a less suitable choice at the helm of Austro-Hungarian diplomacy at such a decisive period as World War I with a greater need for flexibility according to one historian.

The author of the 2014 book, Austro-Hungarian War Aims in the Balkans during World War I, Marvin Benjamin Fried of the London School of Economics and Political Science, offers a similar, but more favourable evaluation. "Although he was criticized as being doctrinaire, inflexible, and a Balkanist without a wider purview, Burián had a clear vision to protect Austro-Hungarian prestige, integrity, and power, which he was determined to uphold in face of compounding internal and external pressures."

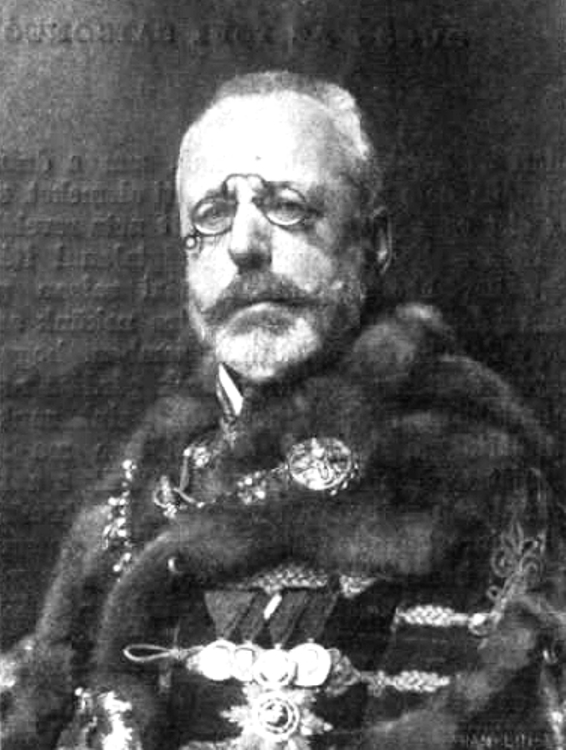
Baron Stephan Burián von Rajecz, 1913

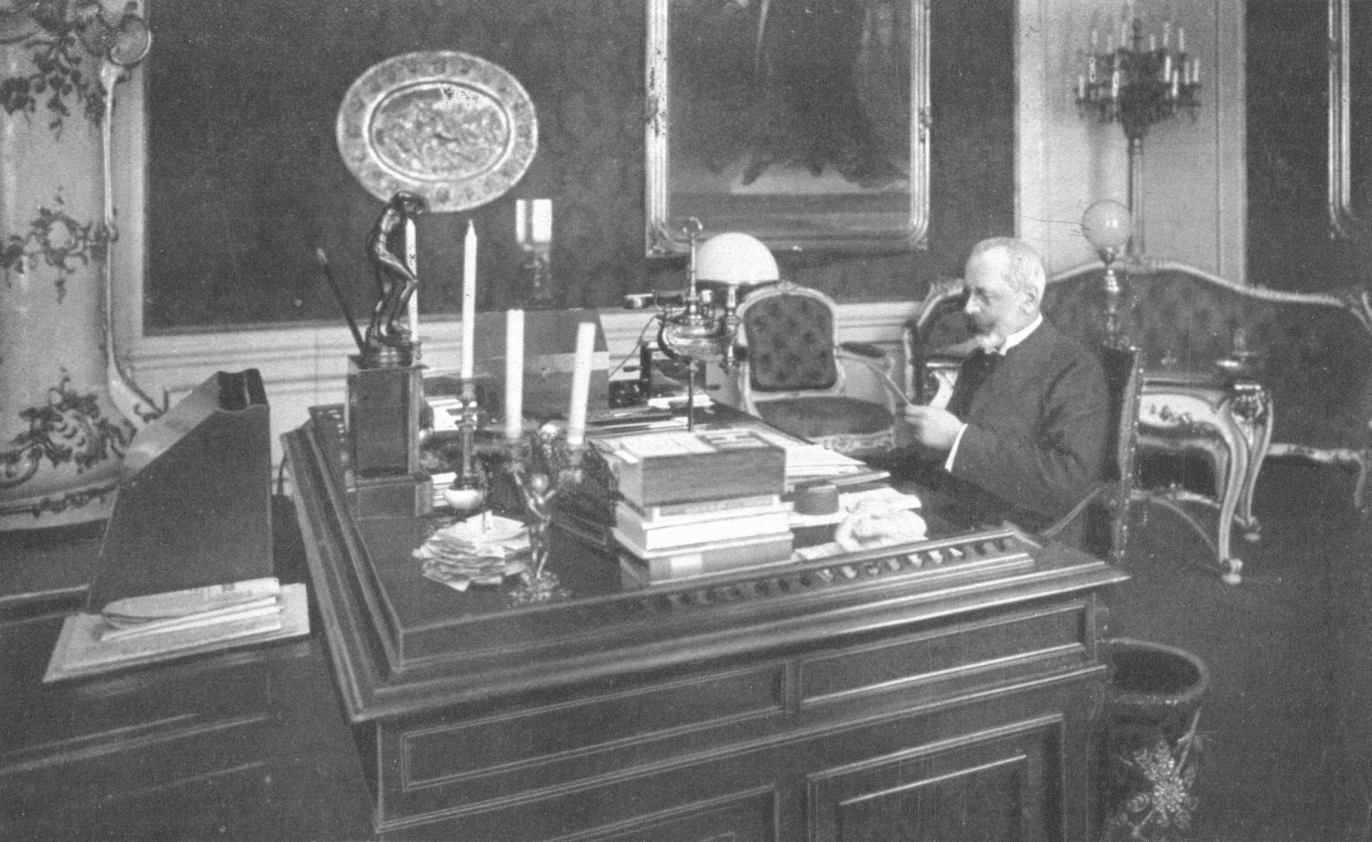
Der Minister Stephan Burián von Rajez 1915

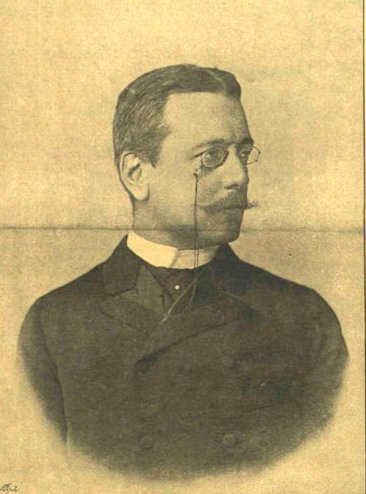
Burián István (Stephan) in 1888

== Honours and awards ==
- (Austrian Empire) (Kingdom of Hungary) Austria-Hungary:
  - Commander of the Order of Franz Joseph, with Star, 1894
  - Grand Cross of the Imperial Order of Leopold, 1905; in Diamonds, 1908
  - Grand Cross of the Royal Hungarian Order of St. Stephen, 1910; in Diamonds, 1916
  - Knight of the Golden Fleece, 1918
- Kingdom of Prussia: Knight of the Black Eagle
- Spain: Grand Cross of the Order of Charles III, 25 January 1908
- Württemberg: Grand Cross of the Friedrich Order, 1897
- Kingdom of Greece: Grand Cross of the Redeemer
- Principality of Bulgaria: Grand Cross of St. Alexander, in Diamonds
- Baden: Grand Cross of the Zähringer Lion, 1897
- Grand Duchy of Hesse: Grand Cross of the Merit Order of Philip the Magnanimous, 31 July 1897
- Ottoman Empire: Order of Osmanieh, 2nd Class
- Kingdom of Romania: Officer of the Star of Romania
- Persian Empire: Order of the Lion and the Sun, 4th Class
- Kingdom of Serbia: Officer of the Cross of Takovo
- Finland: Grand Cross of the Order of the Cross of Liberty

== Works ==
- Drei Jahre: Aus der Zeit meiner Amtsführung im Kriege. Berlin, Verlag Ullstein, 1923. 333 p.
- Austria in dissolution: being the personal recollections of Stephan, Count Burián / translated by Brian Lunn, M. A.. London: E. Benn, 1925. 455 р.

== Bibliography ==
- István Diószegi, A ballplatzi palota utolsó gazdája, Kortárs, 1966.
- Gusztáv Gratz, A dualizmus kora, 1867–1918.

Political offices
Preceded by Agenor Graf Gołuchowski von Gołuchowo	Joint Finance Minister of Austria-Hungary; 1903–1912	Succeeded by Leon Ritter von Biliński
Preceded by László Lukács de Erzsébetváros	Minister besides the King; 1913–1915	Succeeded by Count István Tisza de Borosjenő et Szeged
Preceded by Leopold Graf Berchtold von und zu Ungarschitz, Frättling und Püllütz	Joint Foreign Minister of Austria-Hungary; 1915–1916	Succeeded by Ottokar Graf Czernin von und zu Chudenitz
Preceded by Konrad Prinz zu Hohenlohe-Schillingsfürst	Joint Finance Minister of Austria-Hungary; 1916–1918	Succeeded by Alexander Freiherr von und zu Spitzmüller-Harmersbach
Preceded by Ottokar Graf Czernin von und zu Chudenitz	Joint Foreign Minister of Austria-Hungary; 1918	Succeeded by Julius Graf Andrássy von Csíkszentkirály und Krasznahorka
Diplomatic posts
Preceded by Rüdiger Freiherr von Biegeleben	Austro-Hungarian Consul General to Bulgaria; 1887–1895	Succeeded by Guido Freiherr von Call zu Rosenburg und Kulmbach
Preceded by Theodor Graf Zichy zu Zich und von Vásonykeö	Austro-Hungarian Minister to Württemberg; 1896–1897	Succeeded by Siegfried Graf von Clary und Aldringen
Preceded by Gustav Freiherr von Kosjek	Austro-Hungarian Minister to Greece; 1897–1903	Succeeded by Karl Freiherr von Macchio
