= Allan Serlachius =

Finnish lawyer, professor and politician

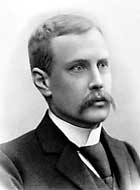
Allan Serlachius

Carl Allan Serlachius (Särkilahti since 1935; 21 March 1870, Porvoo – 10 December 1935, Helsinki) was a Finnish lawyer, a professor and a politician. He was a state legislator, senator and member of parliament.

== Career ==
Serlachius gained a Ph.D. from both degrees at the University of Helsinki in 1898 and later served as professor of criminal law and legal history at the University of Helsinki from 1902 until 1917.

In this capacity, he participated as a member from the clergy to the last Diet of Finland between 1904 and 1906. Serlachius was the Vice-Principal of the University of Helsinki between 1915 and 1917.

He was also the member of the Helsinki City Council between 1912 and 1914 and the Finnish Party MP during the Second Russification period of 1913 to 1916.

After the collapse of the fall of the Czarist regime, Professor Serlachius, representing the Finnish Party, was elected as senator to the Oskari Tokoi's cabinet and its successor cabinet of E. N. Setälä as the head of the Civilian Bureau until 27 November 1917.

After that, he acted as a chargé d'affaires of the newly independent Republic of Finland and later as special envoy and full minister to Oslo, Norway between 1918 and 1919. He was a negotiator of the Treaty of Peace between Austria-Hungary and Finland signed in Vienna on 29 May 1918.

Serlachius was a member of the Supreme Court, as legal counselor between 1923 and 1935.

== Legacy ==
A prize has been rewarded in his honor periodically since 2000 for Finnish practitioners of law who have worked as a researcher or teacher of law.
