= Baron Ladislaus Müller von Szentgyörgy =

Austro-Hungarian diplomat

Ladislaus Freiherr Müller von Szentgyörgy

Austro-Hungarian Minister to Bulgaria
- In office 14 February 1900 – 11 March 1904
- Preceded by: Guido Freiherr von Call zu Rosenburg und Kulmbach
- Succeeded by: Karl Freiherr von Braun

Austro-Hungarian Ambassador to Japan
- In office 30 March 1912 – 25 August 1914
- Preceded by: Guido Freiherr von Call zu Rosenburg und Kulmbach
- Succeeded by: None

Personal details
- Born: 18 October 1855 Budapest, Austria-Hungary (now Hungary)
- Died: March 14, 1941 Budapest, Hungary

Ladislaus Freiherr Müller von Szentgyörgy (Hungarian: szentgyörgyi báró Müller László) (18 October 1855 – 14 March 1941) was an Austro-Hungarian diplomat of Hungarian origin serving as ambassador at Tokyo at the outbreak of World War I.

== Life ==
Born on 18 October 1855 as son of a Budapest apothecary, he entered the Austro-Hungarian foreign service in 1884 through its consular service, which was a distinct branch separate from the diplomatic corps and the staff at the Foreign Ministry in Vienna. Raised to the nobility in 1896 as Ladislaus Müller von Szentgyörgy, he subsequently served as consul general (with the rank of minister) at Sofia from 1900 to 1904.

In March 1904, Müller was appointed as Second Section Chief (equivalent to head of the Political Section) in the Imperial Foreign Ministry in Vienna succeeding Kajetan von Mérey who had been promoted to First Section Chief (equivalent to an Undersecretary). In January 1909, it was Müller's own turn to be promoted to First Section Chief. Elevated to the rank of a Baron in 1910, he was one of the few products of the 19th century nobility in the Austro-Hungarian diplomatic corps.

On 30 March 1912, Baron Müller von Szentgyörgy was appointed as Ambassador to Japan but returned to Vienna following the Japanese declaration of war against Austria-Hungary on 25 August 1914. On 4 January 1917, as part of a larger shake-up of personnel at the Ballhausplatz, he was appointed to serve a second term as First Section Chief but was replaced already in June by Baron von Flotow. He died in Budapest on 14 March 1941 at the age of 85.

Diplomatic posts
Preceded by Guido Freiherr von Call zu Rosenburg und Kulmbach	Austro-Hungarian Minister to Bulgaria; 1900–1904	Succeeded by Karl Freiherr von Braun
Preceded by Kajetan Mérey von Kapos-Mére	Second Section Chief in the Imperial Foreign Ministry; 1904–1909	Succeeded by Karl Freiherr von Macchio
Preceded by Guido Freiherr von Call zu Rosenburg und Kulmbach	First Section Chief in the Imperial Foreign Ministry; 1909–1912	Succeeded by Karl Freiherr von Macchio
Preceded by Guido Freiherr von Call zu Rosenburg und Kulmbach	Austro-Hungarian Ambassador to Japan; 1912–1914	Succeeded by None
Preceded by Karl Freiherr von Macchio	First Section Chief in the Imperial Foreign Ministry; 1917–1918	Succeeded by Ludwig Freiherr von Flotow
