= Consolidated Treaty Series =

Collection of treaties from 1648 to 1918

The Consolidated Treaty Series (CTS) is a collection of multilateral and bilateral treaties signed between 1648 (Peace of Westphalia) and 1918 (end of World War I) inclusive. It contains 243 volumes published between 1969 and 1980 by Oceana Publications. Its general editor was Clive Parry. The treaties are presented in facsimile with English translations as required.
