= Alexander Spitzmüller =

Austrian banker and politician

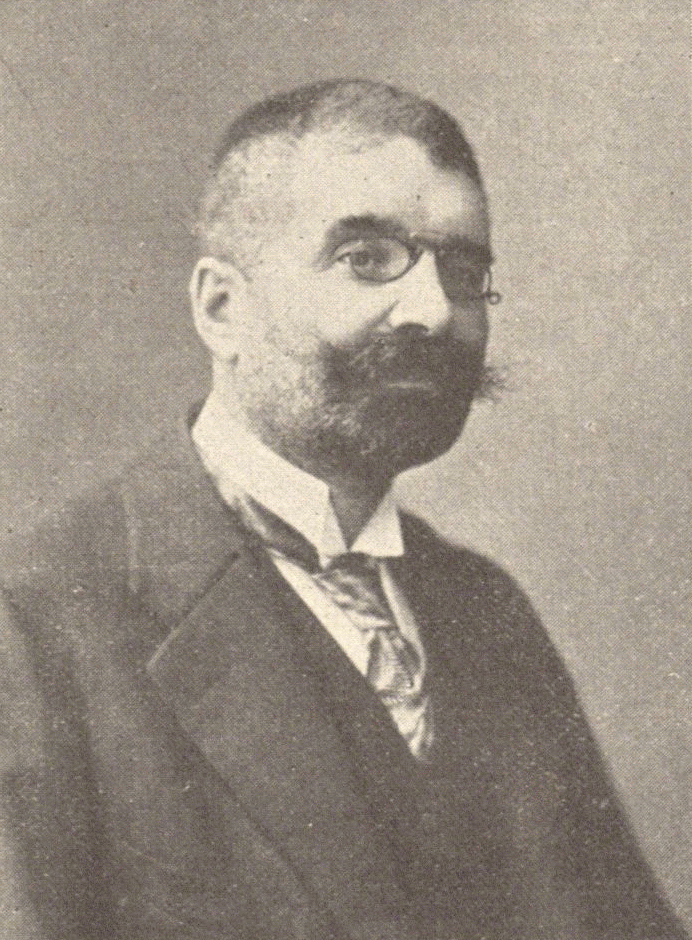
Alexander Spitzmüller, 1918

Alexander Spitzmüller (12 June 1862 in Vienna, Austrian Empire – 5 September 1953 in Velden am Wörther See, Allied-occupied Austria) was an Austrian lawyer, bank director, and politician. In 1886, he entered the Austrian Ministry of Finance, where he held various positions for the next 35 years, culminating in becoming Austrian Minister of Commerce 1915-1916, serving as Austrian Minister of Finances 1916–1917, and finally Austro-Hungarian Minister of Finances from 7 September 1918 to 10 November 1918. Between 1919 and 1922, he served as Governor of the Austro-Hungarian Bank and was entrusted with its liquidation.
