= Adam Tarnowski =

Adam Tarnowski may refer to:

- Adam Tarnowski (senior) (1866–1946), count, Polish and Austrian-Hungarian diplomat
- Adam Tarnowski (minister) (1892–1956), count, Polish and Austrian-Hungarian diplomat, Minister of Foreign affairs in Poland, son of Adam Tarnowski (1866–1946)
