= Zuzana Černínová of Harasov =

Zuzana Černínová of Harasov Czech: Zuzana Černínová z Harasova, German: Zuzana Černínová von Harras) (25 September 1600 or 1601 – 22 February 1654 in Radenín) was a noblewoman from Bohemia and a letter writer.

== Biography ==
Born on 25 September 1600 or 1601, Zuzana Černínová was born to Jiřík Homut of Harasov and Alžběta Cimburk from Choustník. In 1621 she married Jan Czernin of Chudenice (1597–1642), who was a member of the prominent Czernin family. They inherited a home in Nové Mitrovice from her husband's father. She had two sons Humprecht Jan Czernin and Herman Czernin of Chudenice, both of whom played significant roles in the Bohemian Reformation. She died on 22 February 1654 in Radenín and was buried at Church of Saint Margaret of Antioch, Kopčany.

== Letters ==
Correspondence between z Harasova and her sons, which were first found and initially published in 1869, describe her experiences during Thirty Years' War (1618–48), and gives details about life of a noblewoman managing estates, enduring taxation, and dealing with plundering soldiers.

The French historian Ernest Denis, in his work La Bohême depuis la montagne blanche (Bohemia after the White Mountain), stated that the surviving letters of Zuzana Černínová are "an infinitely precious source" for understanding the time in which she lived. Ladislav Stroupežnický made Zuzana Černínová the main character of his one-act play Sirotčí peniešie, in which the heroine triumphs over a Swedish mercenary who wanted to seize the orphan's money.

== Legacy ==
The playwright Ladislav Stroupežnický made Zuzana Černínová the main character in his theatrical play Orphan's Money.

== Sources ==
- Some content translated from corresponding Czech Wikipedia article
- BOROVSKÁ, Hana. Language and correspondence of Humprecht Jan Černín of Chudenice and Zuzana Černínová of Harasov. 1st ed. Brno: Masaryk University, 2013. 378 pp. Writings of the Faculty of Education, Masaryk University; St. No. 161. ISBN 978-80-210-6332-7.
- HOMUTOVÁ Z CIMBURKA, Alžběta, MYSLÍKOVNA Z CHUDENIC, Eliška and DVORSKÝ, František Ivan, ed. Mother and daughter of Zuzana Černínová from Harasov: letters from Alžběta Homutovna from Cimburk and Eliška Myslíkovna from Chuděnice. In Prague: F. Dvorský, 1890.
- ČERNÍNOVÁ Z HARASOVA, Zuzana. Letters of a Czech noblewoman from the middle of the 17th century. In Prague: Ed. Valečka, 1886.
- ČERNÍNOVÁ Z HARASOVA, Zuzana and KALISTA, Zdeněk, ed. Correspondence of Zuzana Černínová from Harasov with her son Humprecht Jan Černín from Chudenice. In Prague: Melantrich, 1941. online at citanka.cz
