= Kněžice =

Kněžice may refer to places in the Czech Republic:

- Kněžice (Chrudim District), a municipality and village in the Pardubice Region]
- Kněžice (Jihlava District), a municipality and village in the Vysočina Region
- Kněžice (Nymburk District), a municipality and village in the Central Bohemian Region
- Kněžice, a village and part of Jablonné v Podještědí in the Liberec Region
- Kněžice, a village and part of Podbořany in the Ústí nad Labem Region
- Kněžice, a village and part of Strážov (Klatovy District) in the Plzeň Region
