= Kněžice (Nymburk District) =

- Municipality
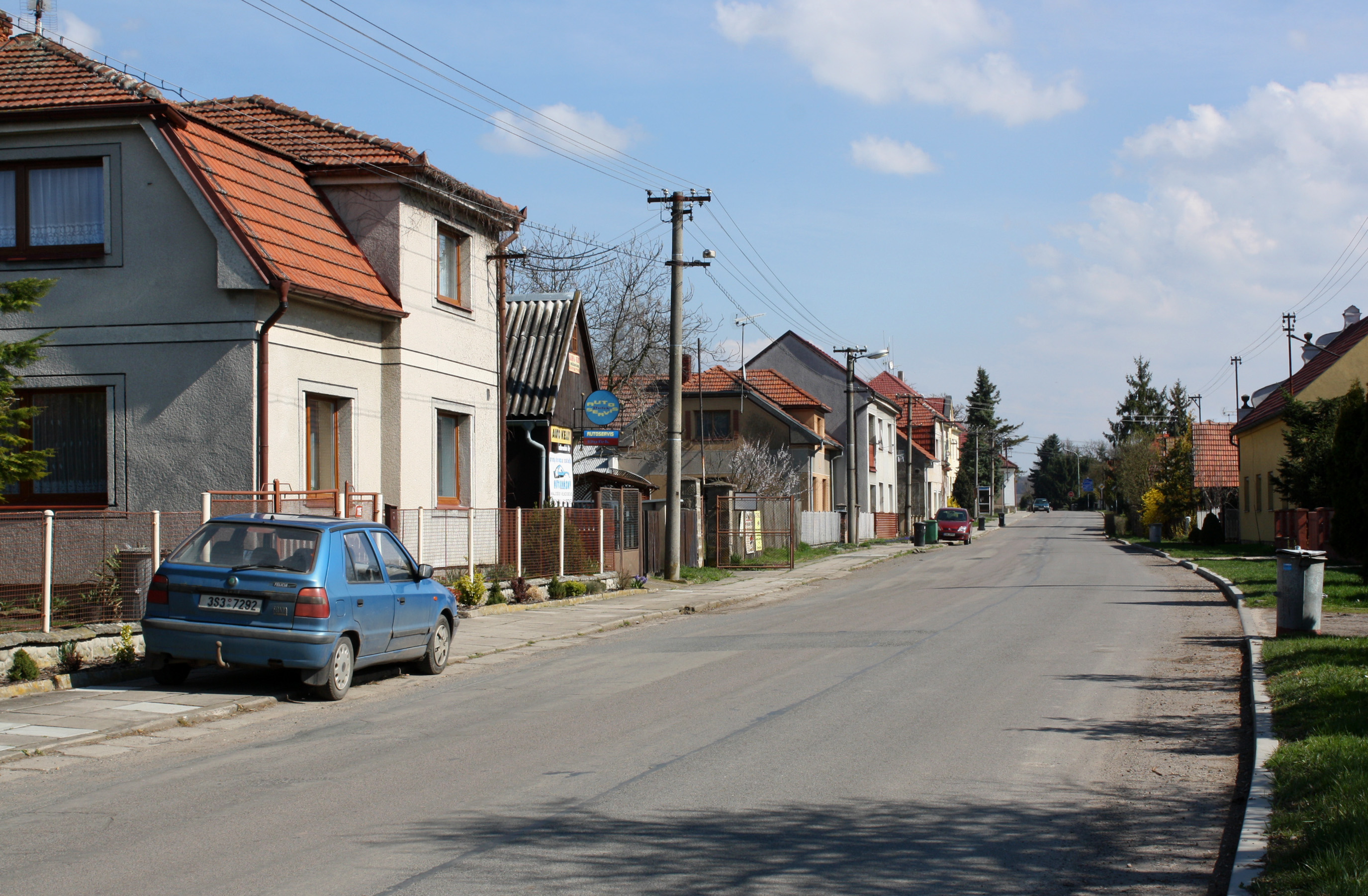
- Western part of Kněžice

- Location in the Czech Republic
- Coordinates: 50°15′26″N 15°20′8″E
- Country: Czech Republic
- Region: Central Bohemian
- District: Nymburk
- First mentioned: 1295

Area
  - Total: 19.58 km^{2} (7.56 sq mi)
- Elevation: 223 m (732 ft)

Population (2026-01-01)
  - Total: 565
  - Density: 28.9/km^{2} (74.7/sq mi)
- Time zone: UTC+1 (CET)
  - Summer (DST): UTC+2 (CEST)
- Postal code: 289 02
- Website: www.obec-knezice.cz

Kněžice is a municipality and village in Nymburk District in the Central Bohemian Region of the Czech Republic. It has about 600 inhabitants.

== Administrative division ==
Kněžice consists of three municipal parts (in brackets population according to the 2021 census):

- Kněžice (403)
- Dubečno (57)
- Osek (49)

== Etymology ==
The name is derived from the word kněz (meaning 'priest', but in Old Czech also 'prince') or from the surname Kněz, meaning "the village of kněz's/Kněz's people".

== Geography ==
Kněžice is located about 22 kilometres (14 mi) east of Nymburk and 60 km (37 mi) east of Prague. It lies mostly in the Central Elbe Table. The eastern part of the municipal territory lies in the East Elbe Table and includes the highest point of Kněžice, the hill Na Pískách at 292 m (958 ft) above sea level. The stream Záhornický potok originates here and flows across the municipality.

== History ==
The first written mention of Kněžice is from 1295, when a fortress stood here and Kněžice was owned by a local noble family that called themselves the Lords of Kněžice. In 1412, the village was bought by Jan Straník of Kopidlno. His family owned the village until 1501, when they sold it to the Trčka of Lípa family. They annexed Kněžice to the Městec Králové estate (from 1587 part of the Dymokury estate).

Dubečno was first mentioned in a deed of King Charles IV from 1372. It was first a part of the Chroustov estate. The first written mention of Osek is from 1436, when Osek, Dubečno and Chroustov were handed over to Havel of Dřevěnice. In the 16th century, Dubečno and Osek also became part of the Městec Králové/Dymokury estate.

After the establishment of independent municipalities in 1848, Kněžice, Dubečno and Osek were three separate municipalities. Dubečno was annexed to the Kněžice municipality in 1961 and Osek in 1980.

== Demographics ==
Historical population

Year	Pop.	±%
1869	1,384	—
1880	1,495	+8.0%
1890	1,495	+0.0%
1900	1,406	−6.0%
1910	1,464	+4.1%

Year	Pop.	±%
1921	1,447	−1.2%
1930	1,356	−6.3%
1950	988	−27.1%
1961	875	−11.4%
1970	706	−19.3%

Year	Pop.	±%
1980	610	−13.6%
1991	537	−12.0%
2001	485	−9.7%
2011	496	+2.3%
2021	509	+2.6%

Source: Censuses

== Transport ==
There are no railways or major roads passing through the municipality.

== Sights ==
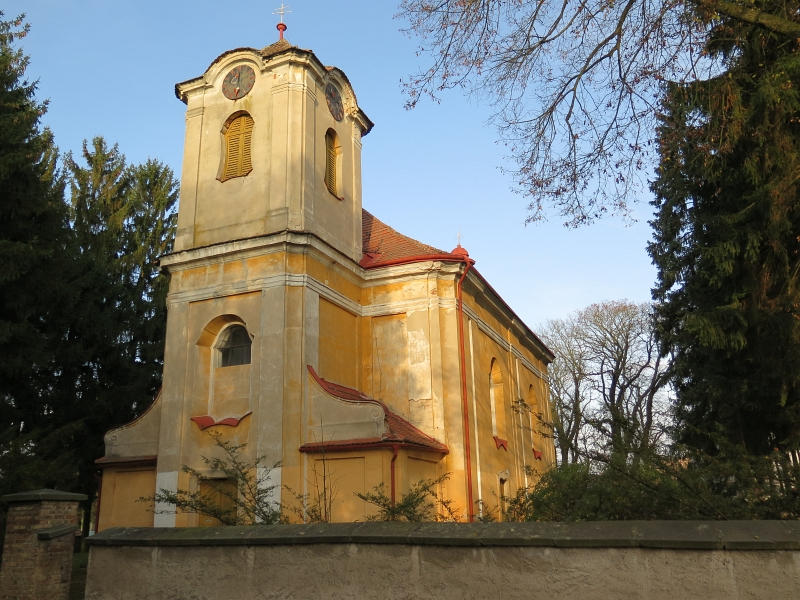
Church of Saints Peter and Paul

The main landmark of Kněžice is the Church of Saints Peter and Paul. It was built in the Baroque style in the 1780s.
