= Paolo Poduje =

Paolo Poduje

Paul Poduje (5 June 1915 in Ljubljana – 8 July 1999 in Milan), known by the code name Mojcano or Moicano (the Mohican), was a Slovenian-born military man and Italian partisan.

He was a member of the Special Operations Executive (SOE) during World War II. Poduje is considered responsible for the Rovetta massacre, in which forty-three soldiers of the 1st Assault Division "M" of the Legion Tagliamento of the National Republican Guard of the Italian Social Republic were shot after surrendering and being delivered to the local National Liberation Committee. His identity remained unknown for many decades but witness statements and documents produced at the subsequent trial showed that he had been parachuted to near Pizzo Formico at the beginning of April 1945 as a captain in the Intelligence Corps under the command of Count Manfred Beckett Czernin. His task was to make contact with partisan groups in the area, in particular with the group known as Giustizia e Libertà. Theories that Poduje was responsible for the summary execution at Rovetta were confirmed when he admitted decades later that he had ordered the shooting of soldiers of the Italian Social Republic.
