= Chroustov =

- Municipality
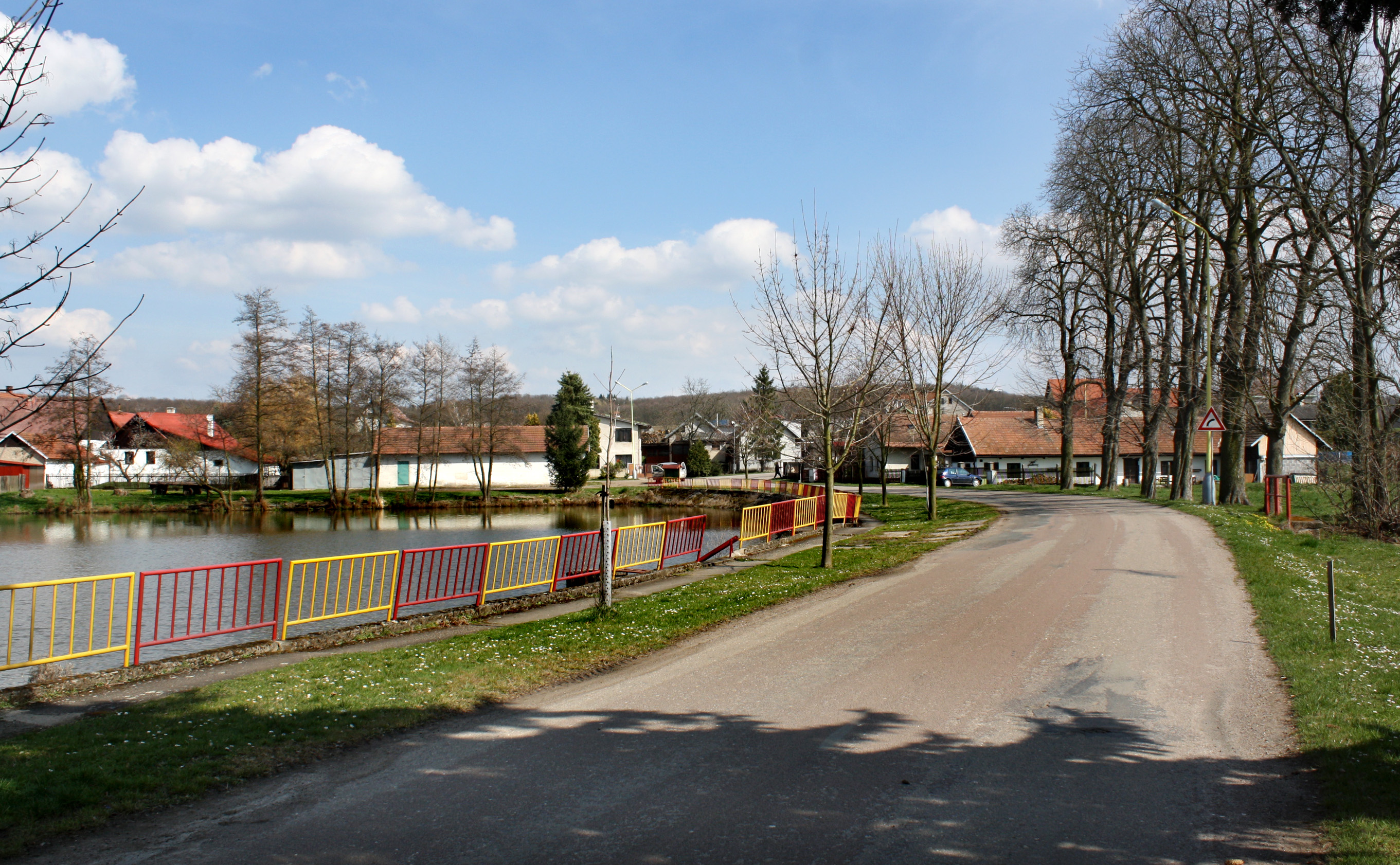
- Eastern part of Chroustov

- Location in the Czech Republic
- Coordinates: 50°17′12″N 15°20′50″E
- Country: Czech Republic
- Region: Central Bohemian
- District: Nymburk
- First mentioned: 1369

Area
  - Total: 7.45 km^{2} (2.88 sq mi)
- Elevation: 248 m (814 ft)

Population (2026-01-01)
  - Total: 196
  - Density: 26.3/km^{2} (68.1/sq mi)
- Time zone: UTC+1 (CET)
  - Summer (DST): UTC+2 (CEST)
- Postal code: 289 02
- Website: www.chroustov.cz

Chroustov is a municipality and village in Nymburk District in the Central Bohemian Region of the Czech Republic. It has about 200 inhabitants.

== Administrative division ==
Chroustov consists of two municipal parts (in brackets population according to the 2021 census):

- Chroustov (176)
- Dvořiště (24)

== Etymology ==
The name is derived from the surname Chroust, meaning "Chroust's (court)".

== Geography ==
Chroustov is located about 24 kilometres (15 mi) northeast of Nymburk and 63 km (39 mi) northeast of Prague. It lies in an undulating agricultural landscape, mostly in the Central Elbe Table. The easternmost part of the municipal territory extends into the East Elbe Table and includes the highest point of Chroustov at 267 m (876 ft) above sea level. The stream Smíchovský potok flows across the municipality and supplies two small fishponds there.

== History ==
The first written mention of Chroustov is from 1369. From 1436 to 1553, the village was ruled by various lesser noblemen. In 1553–1587, Chroustov was owned by the Trčka of Lípa family. From 1587, Chroustov was a part of the Dymokury estate and shared its owners.

== Demographics ==
Historical population

Year	Pop.	±%
1869	648	—
1880	806	+24.4%
1890	797	−1.1%
1900	711	−10.8%
1910	729	+2.5%

Year	Pop.	±%
1921	635	−12.9%
1930	581	−8.5%
1950	441	−24.1%
1961	385	−12.7%
1970	282	−26.8%

Year	Pop.	±%
1980	241	−14.5%
1991	222	−7.9%
2001	201	−9.5%
2011	215	+7.0%
2021	200	−7.0%

Source: Censuses

== Transport ==
There are no railways or major roads passing through the municipality.

== Sights ==
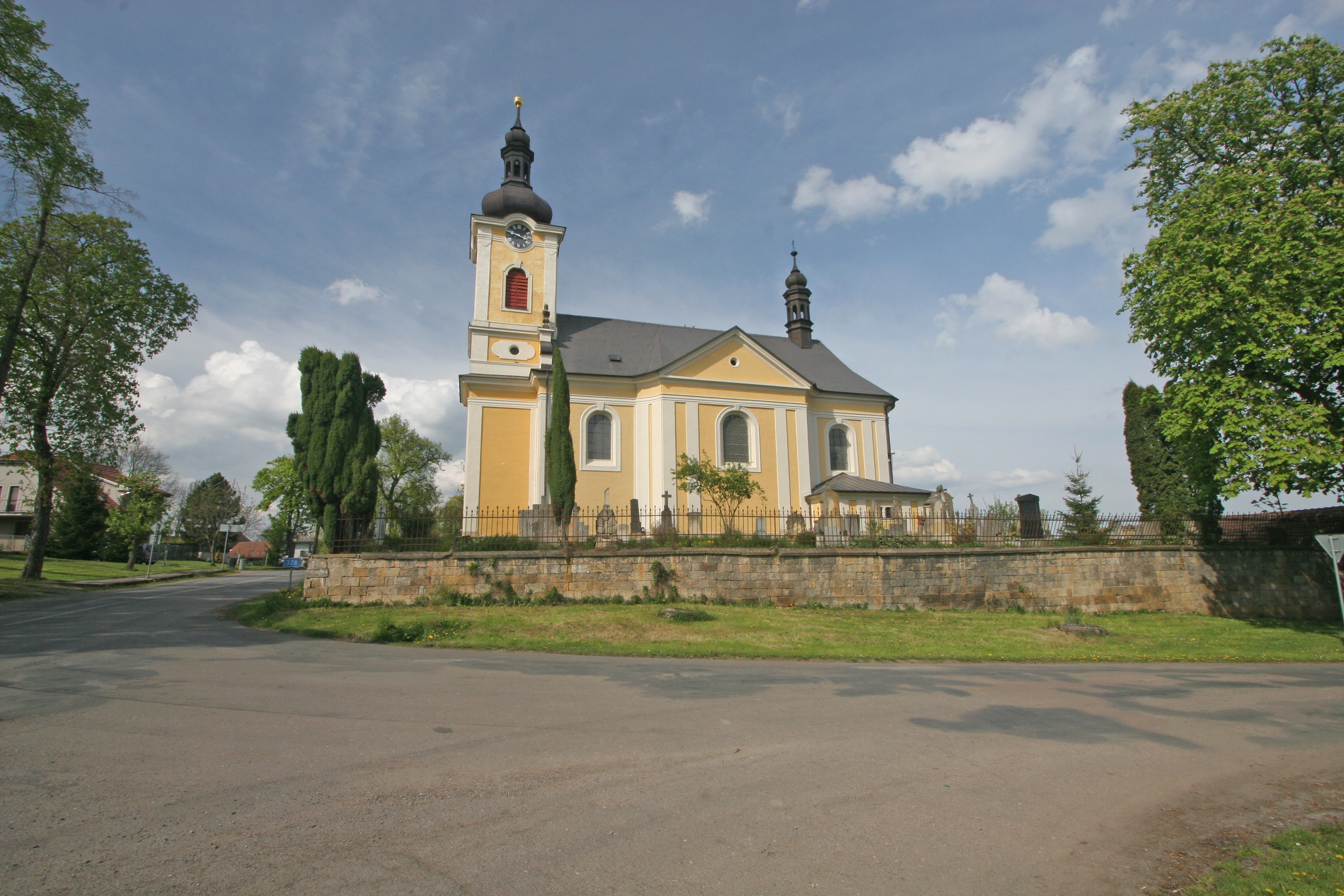
Church of the Assumption of the Virgin Mary

The main landmark of Kněžice is the Church of the Assumption of the Virgin Mary. It was built in the Baroque style at the beginning of the 18th century.
