= Czernin Palace =

Palace in Prague, Czechia

Coordinates: 50°05′20″N 14°23′25″E

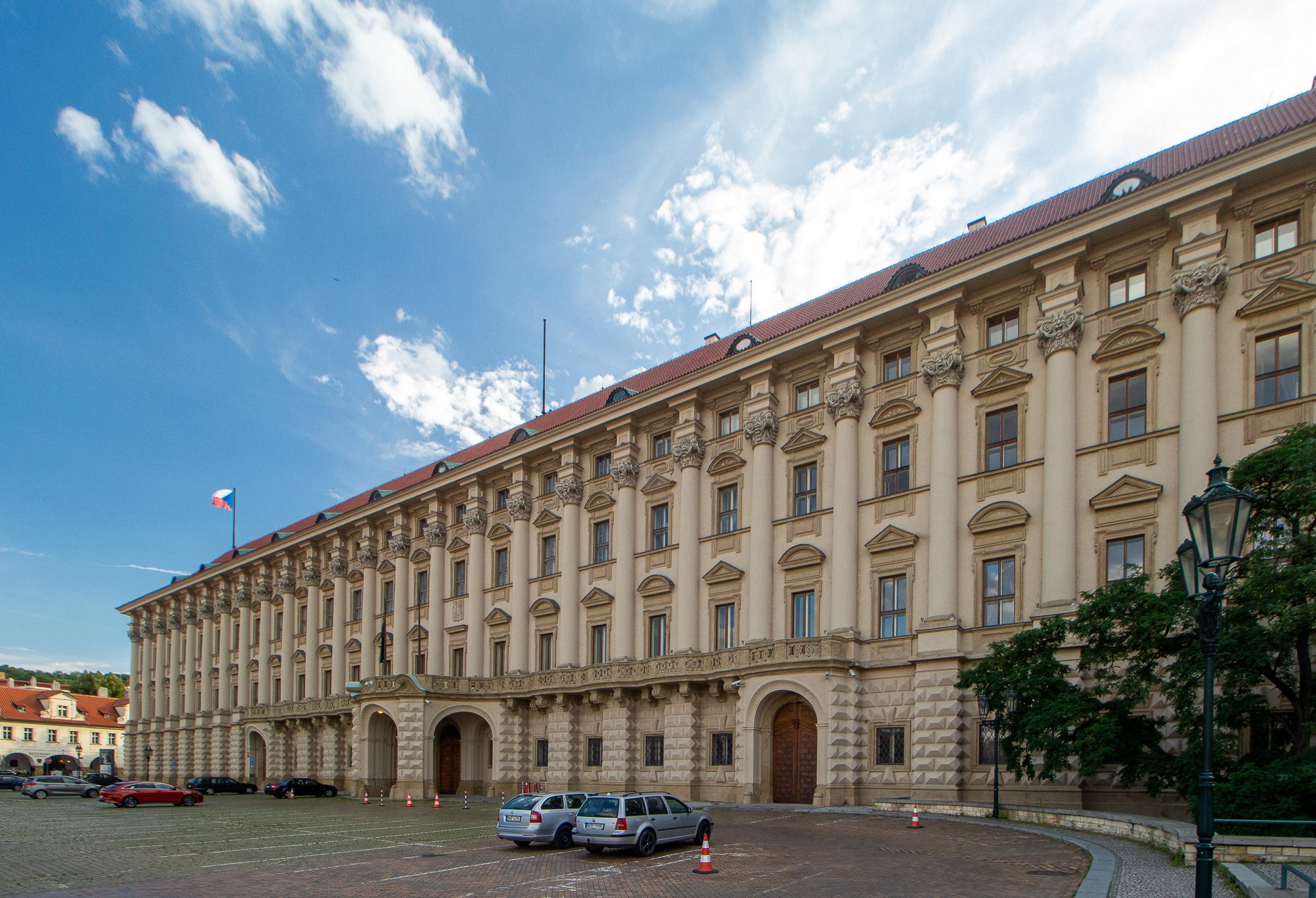
Czernin Palace seen from Loretánské Square opposite the Loreta

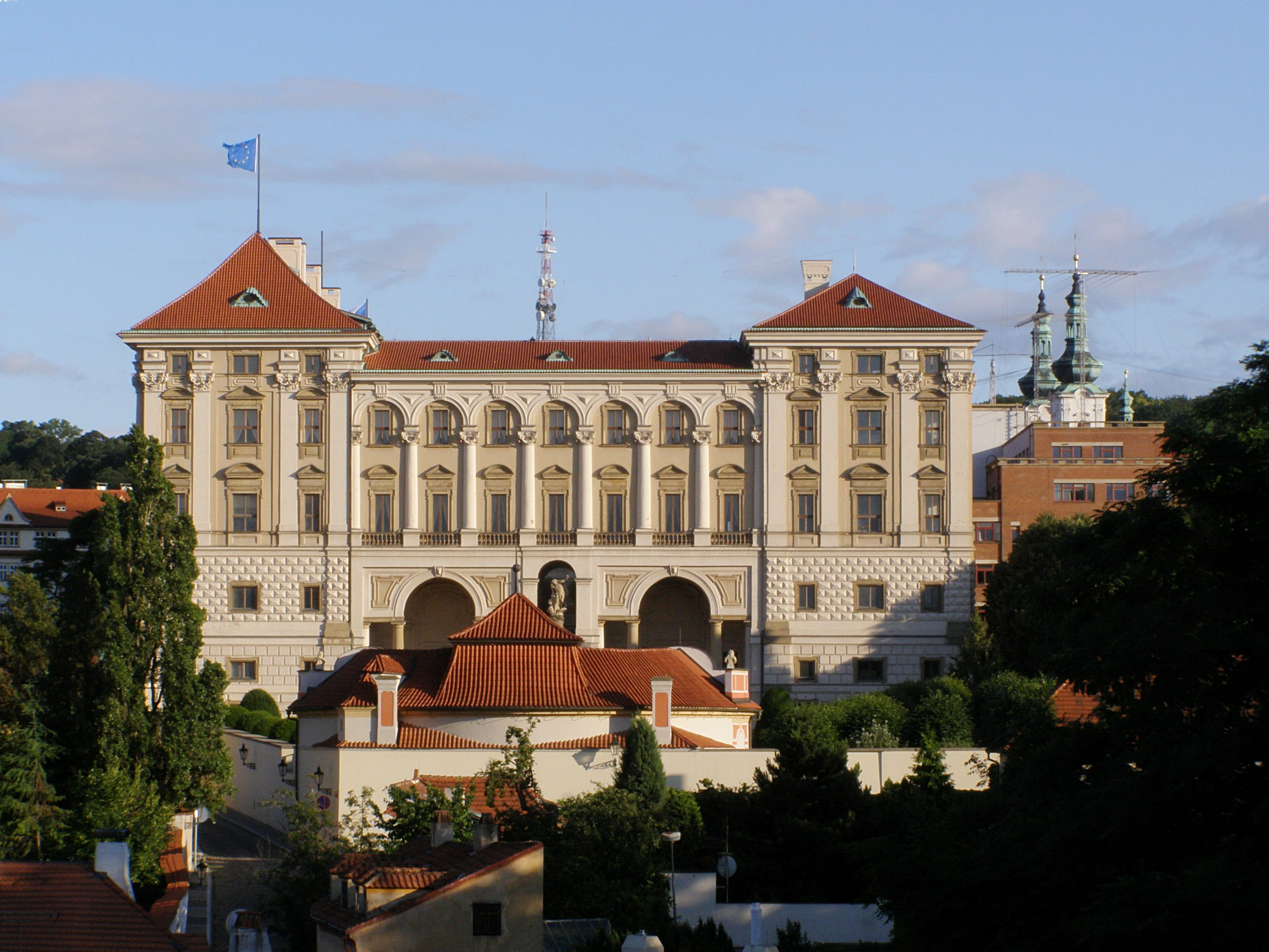
Czernin Palace seen from Hradčany

The Czernin Palace (Czech: Černínský palác) is the largest of the baroque palaces of Prague, which has served as the offices of the Czechoslovak and later Czech foreign ministry since the 1930s. It was commissioned by the diplomat Humprecht Jan Czernin, the Habsburg imperial ambassador to Venice and Rome, in the 1660s.

The palace features stuccos by Italian artists.

== History ==
In 1666, Humprecht Jan Czernin purchased a part of the debt loaded property of the House of Lobkowicz, including a building plot with gardens located in the centre of Prague. In 1668, he commissioned Francesco Caratti, a Swiss-Italian architect, and assigned him to develop the project of his new palace on the site.

The next year, building contractors Gione Decapaoli and Abraham Leuthner started construction. The plasterers Giovanni Maderna and Giovanni Battista Cometa were replaced by Francesco Peri and Antonio Travelli in 1674.

== See also ==
- Czernin family
