= Rovetta massacre =

1945 killings in Italy

- Location: Rovetta, Italy
- Date: 27–28 April 1945
- Target: National Republican Guard prisoners of war
- Attack type: Summary executions
- Deaths: 43
- Perpetrator: Italian partisans

The Rovetta massacre is the name given to the summary execution of 43 Italian soldiers that took place in Rovetta on the night of 27–28 April 1945. The soldiers were of the 1ª Divisione d'Assalto "M" della Legione Tagliamento, part of the National Republican Guard of the Italian Social Republic.

== The surrender ==
At the end of October 1943, the 1ª Divisione d'Assalto "M" Tagliamento was transferred to Brescia, more particularly to Val Camonica, with orders to defend the lines of communication of the Wehrmacht and the construction sites of the Organisation Todt, and to engage groups of partisans. Territorial contiguity meant that its presence also extended to the Province of Bergamo. On 26 April 1945, a group from the military garrison on the route known as the Cantoniera della Presolana commanded by Sub-lieutenant Roberto Panzanelli heard over the radio that the Nazi Fascist regime had surrendered; they accordingly decided to abandon their garrison and head for Bergamo. They set off along the valley, led by Alessandro Franceschetti carrying a white flag; he was the hotelkeeper with whom they had been billeted on the Pass of Presolana. Upon reaching Rovetta they decided to lay down their arms and surrender to the local National Liberation Committee (NLC); the latter agreed that they be treated as prisoners of war with all the attendant safeguards. Sub-lieutenant Panzanelli signed a document to this effect and had it countersigned by the parish priest, Don Bravi, a member of the NLC of Maggiore Pacifico, and others. This committee was self-proclaimed, but its guarantees were worthless – a fact unbeknown to Panzanelli. The soldiers laid down their arms and were moved to the village school pending transfer to the jurisdiction of the Italian state or to the armies of the allied forces.

== Execution by firing squad ==
On 28 April a group of partisans belonging to the 53ª Brigata Garibaldi Tredici Martiri, the Brigata Camozzi and the Brigate Fiamme Verdi arrived in the village and took the soldiers from the school to a point near the local cemetery. On the way, one of the prisoners, Fernando Caciolo, managed to escape and hide, finally taking refuge in the house of the priest, Don Bravi, where he stayed for three months before returning to his home village, Anagni. Sub-lieutenant Panzanelli offered up the signed documents showing their guarantee of status as prisoners of war, but it was torn up and trampled underfoot. At the cemetery, two firing squads were formed and 43 of the prisoners, all between 15 and 22 years of age, were shot. Three men were spared on account of their youth. One of the men, 20-year-old Giuseppe Mancini, the last to be shot, was forced to take part in the execution of his comrades. It later became known that Mancini was the son of Edvige Mussolini, the sister of Benito Mussolini.

== The victims ==
The following is a list of the victims, alphabetically by surname, with their ages and towns:

- Fernando Andrisano, 22, Brindisi
- Antonio Aversa, 19, Ceccano
- Vincenzo Balsamo, 17, Ficulle
- Carlo Banci, 15, Roma
- Fiorino Bettineschi, 18, Borno
- Alfredo Bulgarelli, 17, Forli
- Bartolomeo Valerio Gazzaniga, 21, Varenna
- Carlo Cavagna, 19, Roma
- Fernando Cristini, 21, Corana
- Silvano Dell'Armi, 16, Roma
- Bruno Dilzeni, 20, Carpendolo
- Romano Ferlan, 18, Fiume
- Antonio Fontana, 20, Ghibellina
- Vincenzo Fontana, 19, Roma
- Giuseppe Foresti, 18, Credano
- Bruno Fraia, 19, Fiume
- Ferruccio Gallozzi, 19, Roma
- Francesco Garofalo, 19, Latina
- Giovanni Gerra, 18, San Venzano
- Mario Giorgi, 16, Tolmezzo
- Balilla Grippaudo, 20, Roma
- Franco Lagna, 17, Collegno
- Enrico Marino, 20, Tonco
- Giuseppe Mancini, 20, Premilcuore
- Giovanni Martinelli, 20, Dosolo
- Roberto Panzanelli, 22, Ficulle
- Stefano Pennacchio, 18, Roma
- Mario Pielucci, 17, Roma
- Guido Piovaticci, 17, Roma
- Alfredo Pizzitutti, 17, Gibellina
- Alvaro Porcarelli, 20, Matelica
- Vittorio Rampini, 19, Rome
- Giuseppe Randi, 18, Sulmona
- Mario Randi, 16, Sulmona
- Sergio Rasi, 17, Roma
- Ettore Solari, 20, La Spezia
- Bruno Taffurelli, 21
- Italo Terranera, 19, Rome
- Pietro Uccellini, 19, San Venzano
- Luigi Umena, 20, Ficulle
- Carlo Villa, 19, Monza
- Aldo Zarrelli, 19, Tivoli
- Franco Zolli, 16, Roma

== Responsibility for the massacre ==
The responsibility for the massacre was attributed to Slovenian-born Paolo Poduje, known by the code name of Moicano, a member of the Special Operations Executive (SOE). It was he who gave the order for the soldiers to be removed from the school and executed. The identity of Moicano remained unknown for many decades, but witness statements and documents produced at the subsequent trial showed that he had been parachuted to near Pizzo Formico at the beginning of April 1945 as a captain in the Intelligence Corps under the command of Count Manfred Beckett Czernin. His task was to make contact with partisan groups in the area, in particular with the group known as Giustizia e Libertà. Theories that Poduje was responsible for the summary execution at Rovetta were confirmed when Moicano admitted at the beginning of the 21st century that he had indeed ordered the shooting of soldiers of the Italian Social Republic.

== The trial ==
The Italian public prosecutor at Bergamo opened criminal proceedings in 1946. However, in 1951 it was concluded that no one could be found guilty as the summary execution was deemed not to have been a crime but an act of war. This decision was based on the fact that the official occupation of the Province of Bergamo ceased on 1 May 1945. Poduje died 8 July 1999.

== See also ==
- National Liberation Committee for Northern Italy
- National Republican Guard (Italy)

== Sources ==
- Angelo Bendotti e Elisabetta Ruffini, Gli ultimi fuochi: 28 April 1945, a Rovetta, Bergamo, Il filo di Arianna (2008).
- Giuliano Fiorani, Onore – Una strage: perché?, Grafica MA.RO (2005).
- Lodovico Galli, L'eccidio di Rovetta: 28 April 1945 una spietata rappresaglia nella Bergamasca, Montichiari, Zanetto (1994), p. 185.
- Massimo Lucioli e Davide Sabatini, Rovetta 1945, Settimo Sigillo (2001).
- Nazareno Marinoni, La terrazza sul cortile. I fatti di Rovetta del 28 April 1945 nei ricordi di un bambino, Bergamo, Il filo di Arianna (2005).
- Carlo Mazzantini, I Balilla andarono a Salò, Venezia, Marsilio (1997).
- Gianpaolo Pansa, Il sangue dei vinti, Milano, Sperling & Kupfer editore (2003), pp. 193–206.
- Grazia Spada, Il Moicano e i fatti di Rovetta, Milano, Medusa Edizioni (2008).
