= James Francis Jewell Archibald =

American war correspondent

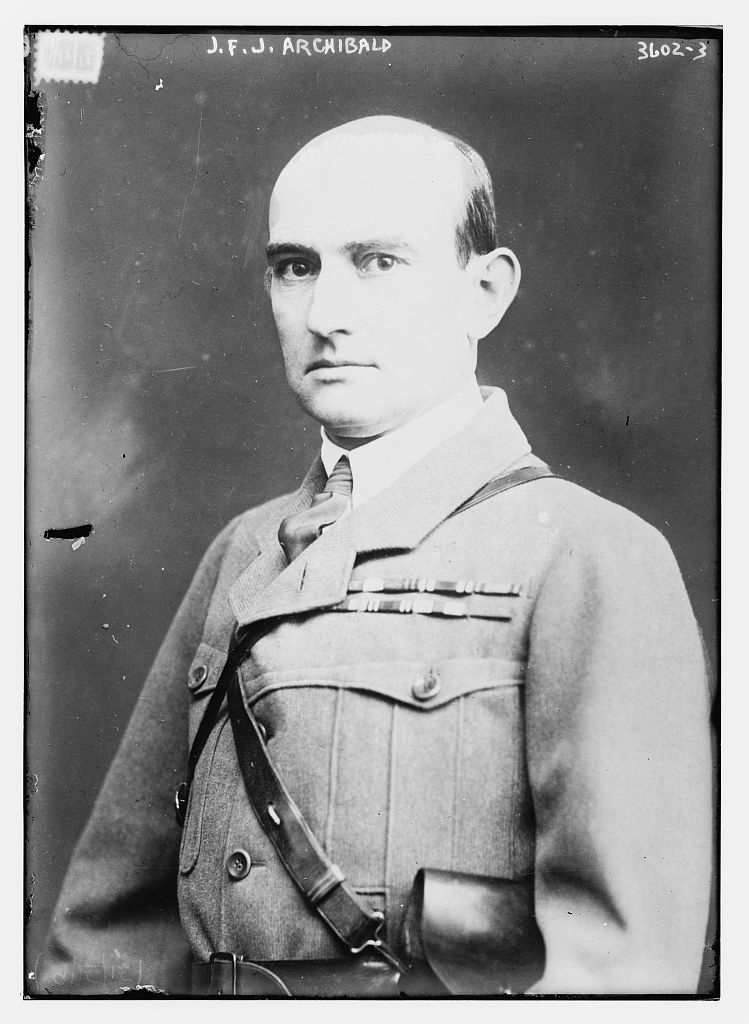
- Archibald circa 1915
- Born: September 22, 1871; Chautauqua County, New York, US
- Died: May 29, 1934 (aged 62); Hollywood, California, US
- Known for: first man wounded in the Spanish–American War

James Francis Jewell Archibald (September 22, 1871 – May 29, 1934) was an American war correspondent. He was the first man wounded in the Spanish–American War. He was embedded with German troops in World War I and was arrested when he returned to the United States.

== Biography ==
He was born on September 22, 1871, in Chautauqua County, New York to Dr. Francis Albert Archibald and Martha Washington Jewell. He graduated from Ohio Wesleyan University in 1888.

By 1910 he was living in Washington, DC.

He was detained by the British in World War I and was found to be carrying a letter from Constantin Theodor Dumba, the Austro-Hungarian Ambassador to the United States to Stephan Burián von Rajecz, the Minister for Foreign Affairs in Vienna. The letter described a plan to delay the production of American munitions by a strike action. He was charged with performing an "unneutral service" and later released.

His wife filed for divorce in 1927.

He committed suicide with a gunshot on May 29, 1934, in Hollywood, California.

== Publications ==
- Blue Shirt and Khaki: A Comparison (1901)
