= Radenín =

- Municipality
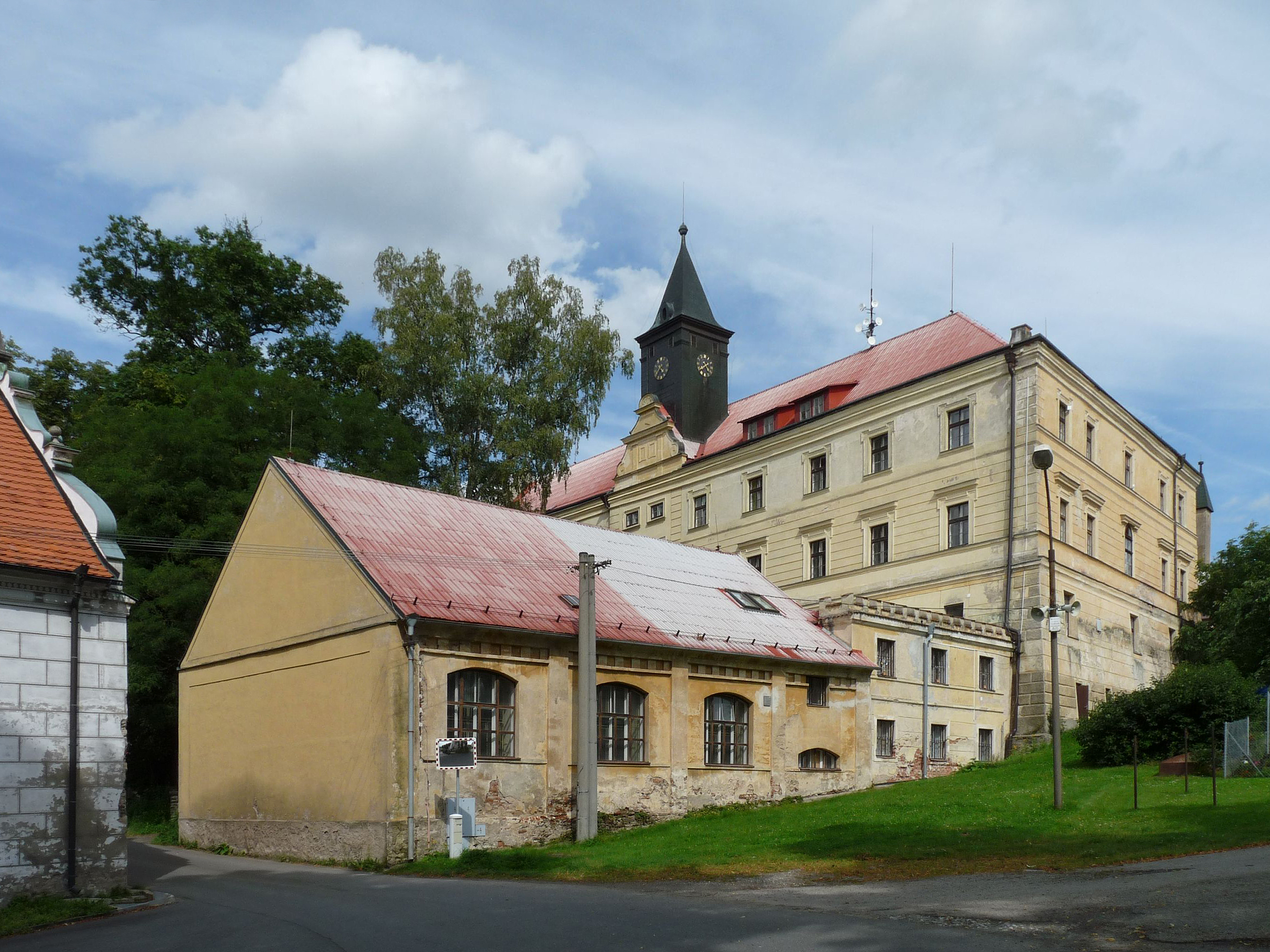
- Radenín Castle

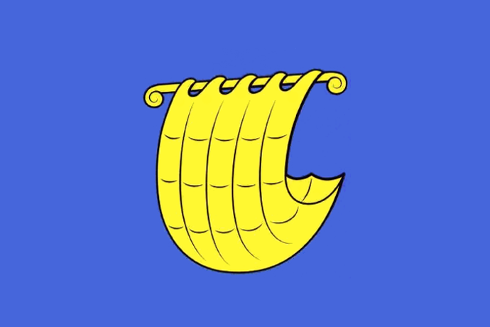
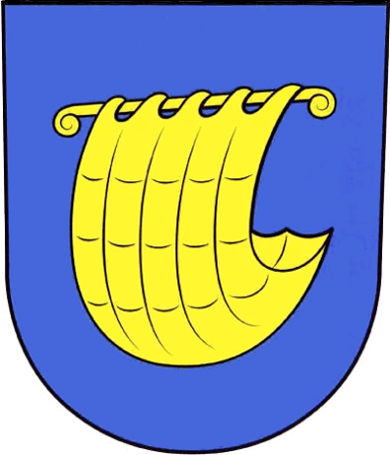
- Flag Coat of arms

- Location in the Czech Republic
- Coordinates: 49°22′10″N 14°50′27″E
- Country: Czech Republic
- Region: South Bohemian
- District: Tábor
- First mentioned: 1300

Area
  - Total: 26.93 km^{2} (10.40 sq mi)
- Elevation: 503 m (1,650 ft)

Population (2026-01-01)
  - Total: 500
  - Density: 19/km^{2} (48/sq mi)
- Time zone: UTC+1 (CET)
  - Summer (DST): UTC+2 (CEST)
- Postal codes: 391 20, 391 55
- Website: www.radenin.cz

Radenín is a municipality and village in Tábor District in the South Bohemian Region of the Czech Republic. It has about 500 inhabitants.

== Administrative division ==
Radenín consists of five municipal parts (in brackets population according to the 2021 census):

- Radenín (262)
- Bítov (29)
- Hroby (24)
- Kozmice (82)
- Lažany (52)
- Nuzbely (51)
- Terezín (30)

== Etymology ==
The original name of the village was Radonín. The name was derived from the personal name Radoň, meaning "Radoň's (court)". In the second half of the 14th century, the name was distorted to Radenín.

== Geography ==
Radenín is located about 12 kilometres (7 mi) east of Tábor and 50 km (31 mi) northeast of České Budějovice. It lies in the Křemešník Highlands. The highest point is the Blaník hill at 659 m (2,162 ft) above sea level. The stream Turovecký potok flows through the municipality.

== History ==
The first written mention of Radenín is from 1300.

== Demographics ==
Historical population

Year	Pop.	±%
1869	2,122	—
1880	2,154	+1.5%
1890	1,989	−7.7%
1900	1,819	−8.5%
1910	1,615	−11.2%

Year	Pop.	±%
1921	1,522	−5.8%
1930	1,413	−7.2%
1950	1,048	−25.8%
1961	1,141	+8.9%
1970	860	−24.6%

Year	Pop.	±%
1980	687	−20.1%
1991	520	−24.3%
2001	440	−15.4%
2011	522	+18.6%
2021	530	+1.5%

Source: Censuses

== Transport ==
There are no railways or major roads passing through the municipality.

== Sights ==
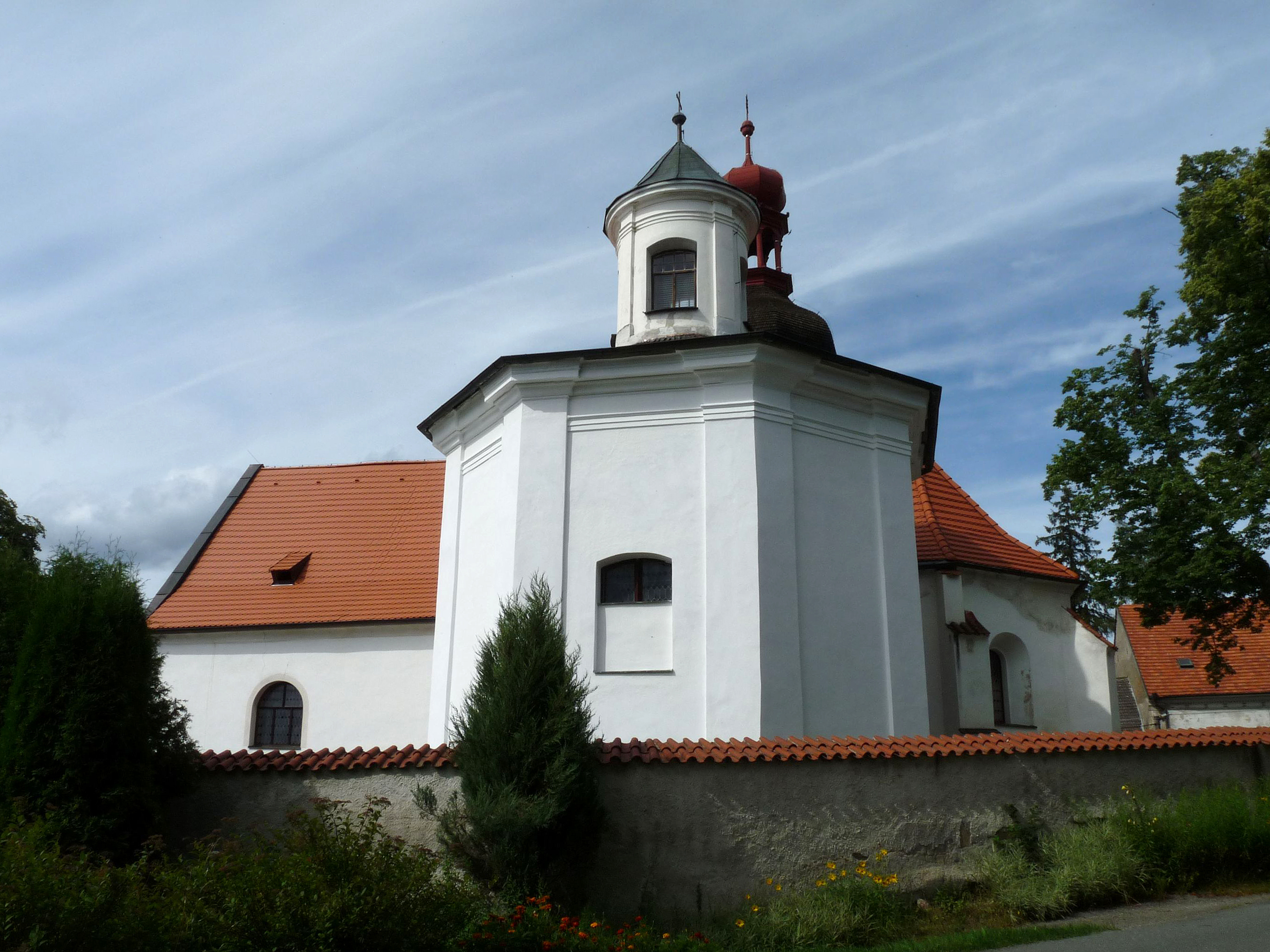
Church of Saint Margaret

The main landmarks of Radenín are the church and the castle. The castle was originally a fortress, first mentioned in 1363, which was rebuilt into a Renaissance residence at the beginning of the 17th century. In the first half of the 19th century, Neoclassical modification were made; further Neo-Renaissance modifications were made in 1869–1878. Today it houses an orphanage.

The Church of Saint Margaret is a fortified church built in the Gothic style in the 14th century (before 1369). In the second half of the 16th century, it was modified in the Renaissance style. In 1732, the Chapel of Saint Barbara was added to the church.

The Church of the Assumption of the Virgin Mary is located in Hroby. The originally Gothic church was built in 1358. The church was damaged by fires in 1596, 1666 and 1791 and was reconstructed many times. In 1724, the tower was added.

== Notable people ==
- Zuzana Černínová of Harasov, (1600/1601–1654), letter writer; died here
- Humprecht Jan Czernin (1628–1682), noble and diplomat
