= Count Otto von Czernin =

Austro-Hungarian diplomat

Otto Graf Czernin von und zu Chudenitz
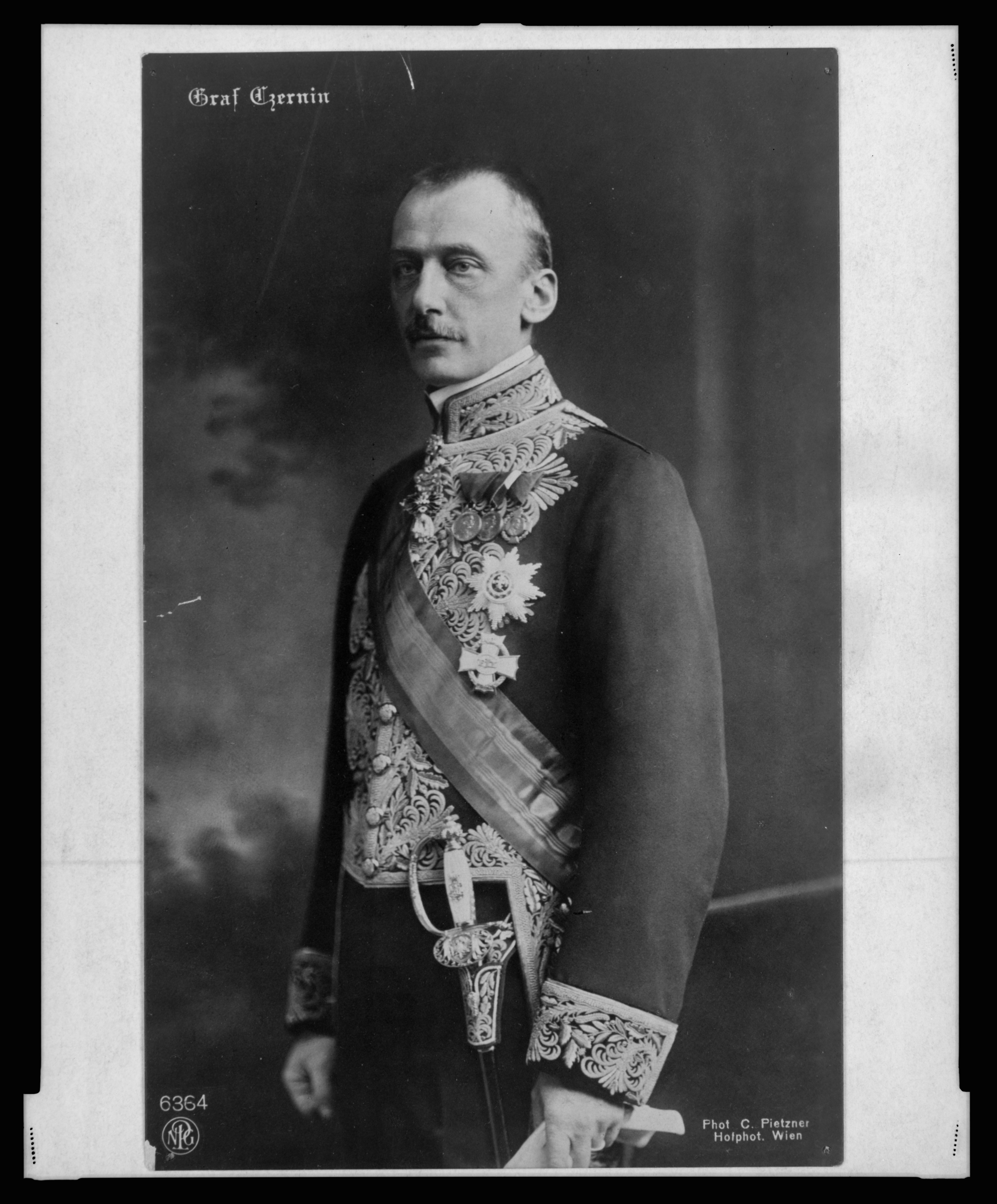

Austro-Hungarian Minister to Bulgaria
- In office 24 January 1917 – 11 November 1918
- Preceded by: Ludwig Graf Széchényi von Sárvár und Felsövidék
- Succeeded by: None

Personal details
- Born: 27 August 1875 Dimokur, Austria-Hungary (now Czech Republic)
- Died: 14 June 1962 (aged 86) Salzburg, Austria
- Spouse(s): Lucy, née Beckett (1884–1979); Maria Lisa, née Pfeiffer (1899–1983)

Otto Rudolf Theobald Ottokar Maria Graf Czernin von und zu Chudenitz (Czech: Otto Rudolf Theobald Ottokar Maria hrabě Černín z Chudenic; 27 August 1875 – 14 June 1962) was an Austro-Hungarian diplomat during the time of World War I.

== Life and career ==
Born in Dimokur (Dymokury) on 27 August 1875 into an ancient Bohemian House of Czernin, as the third son of Count Theobald Czernin von und zu Chudenitz (1836–1893) and his wife, Countess Anna Maria von Westphalen zu Fürstenberg (1850–1924). He was a younger brother of Ottokar, also a diplomat who would become Austro-Hungarian Foreign Minister during World War I. He married Lucy Beckett (1884–1979), daughter of Ernest Beckett, 2nd Baron Grimthorpe, in London in 1903. The marriage produced three sons, but they divorced shortly after the outbreak of the war in 1914. In 1939, he married Maria Lisa Pfeiffer (1899–1983) in Bratislava.

Following studies at the Diplomatic Academy, Count von Czernin entered the Austro-Hungarian foreign service and was first dispatched to London and in 1904 to Rome. He was considered a disciple of Foreign Minister Count Lexa von Aehrenthal, whose activist expansionary policies he supported during the Bosnian annexation crisis in 1908.

Before the war, Count von Czernin served as a Counselor to the Embassy in St. Petersburg and served as Chargé d'Affaires during the first weeks of the July Crisis as the Ambassador Count von Szapáry was absent due to the illness of his wife. He was therefore in charge of dealing directly with Russian Foreign Minister Sazonov until Count Szapáry returned to the Russian capital in mid-July.

Following the outbreak of war, Count von Czernin returned to Vienna and was employed by the Imperial and Royal Army. On 24 January 1917, he was dispatched to Sofia as Minister replacing Count von Széchényi who had been there only a few months. In Sofia, he wielded significant influence over Bulgarian policy-making during the last months of the war. Considered an able diplomat and judged by some as superior to his older brother, he left his post on 4 November 1918.

After the war, Count von Czernin resigned from public service and sought to ward off expropriations of his Bohemian estates in Czechoslovakia. In the 1930s, he expressed some sympathies with the Nazi Party, although his son, Manfred (who had remained with his mother in England), was a RAF pilot during World War II. Following World War II, he joined Otto von Habsburg's cause for a unified Europe.

Count von Czernin died in Salzburg on 14 June 1962.

Diplomatic posts
Preceded by Ludwig Graf Széchényi von Sárvár und Felsövidék	Austro-Hungarian Minister to Bulgaria; 1917–1918	Succeeded by None
