= Konstantin Dumba =

Austro-Hungarian diplomat

Konstantin (Graf von) Dumba
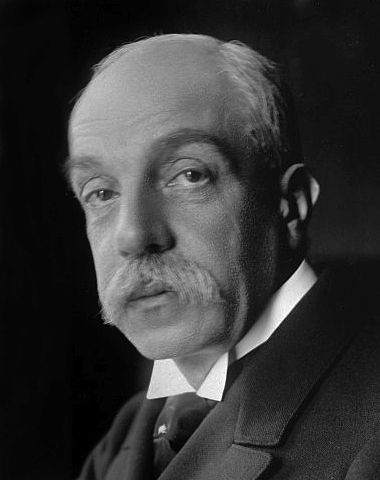

Austro-Hungarian Minister to Serbia
- In office 7 January 1903 – 27 June 1905
- Preceded by: Karl Freiherr Heidler von Egeregg und Syrgenstein
- Succeeded by: Moritz Freiherr Czikann von Wahlborn

Austro-Hungarian Minister to Sweden
- In office 21 March 1909 – 16 October 1912
- Preceded by: Albert Freiherr Eperjesy von Szászváros und Tóti
- Succeeded by: Maximilian Graf Hadik von Futak

Austro-Hungarian Ambassador to the United States
- In office 4 March 1913 – 4 November 1915
- Preceded by: Ladislaus Freiherr Hengelmüller von Hengervár
- Succeeded by: Adam Graf Tarnowski von Tarnów

Personal details
- Born: 17 June 1856 Vienna, Austria-Hungary (now Austria)
- Died: 6 January 1947 (aged 90) Bodensdorf am Ochiacher See, Austria

Konstantin Theodor (from 1917 to 1919, Graf von) Dumba (17 June 1856 – 6 January 1947), was an Austro-Hungarian diplomat serving as its last accredited Ambassador to the United States and famous for having been expelled during World War I following accusations of espionage.

== Life ==
Konstantin Dumba was born in Vienna on 17 June 1856 as the nephew of Nikolaus Dumba (1830–1900), a wealthy Austrian entrepreneur. The Dumba were of Aromanian or Greek descent, originally from the village of Vlasti in the Ottoman province of Rumelia, had emigrated and settled in Vienna in 1817. His father, Theodor Dumba, a native of Serres, was a donor to the Young Romania Student Association in Vienna and to various charity projects in his native town, while his mother, Anna von Vrani, was a Hungarian aristocrat of Aromanian origin. After completing his legal studies and obtaining a doctorate in law, he joined the Austro-Hungarian foreign service in 1879. He subsequently served at the Austro-Hungarian Embassy at London from 1881 to 1886 and then at St. Petersburg, Rome, Bucharest and Paris. While he was a liaison adviser at the Austro-Hungarian Embassy in Bucharest (January 1894-December 1895), Dumba faced anti-Habsburg protests generated by the Transylvanian Memorandum trials.

From 1903 to 1905, Dr. Dumba served as Minister at Belgrade in the Kingdom of Serbia. Then followed four years of service in the Ministry of Foreign Affairs in Vienna, whereupon he was appointed Minister at Stockholm in 1909 where he stayed until 1912. He was known for being Austria-Hungary's only bourgeois ambassador at the time although he was from a very wealthy family.

On 4 March 1913, Dr. Dumba was appointed as the successor of Baron Hengelmüller von Hengervár, the long time ambassador to Washington D.C. and dean of the diplomatic corps. He presented his letter of credentials to President Wilson on 24 April 1913. Although the first months in office were calm, the outbreak of World War I would quickly put him in the spotlight.

A first controversy concerned the Austro-Hungarian government's offer of 'rehabilitation' to those of its citizens living abroad and who had fled to escape compulsory military service provided they returned home and served in the army. This scheme ran counter to the U.S. official policy of neutrality forbidding its citizens from actively taking sides in the war. However, a much more serious incident erupted in early September 1915 when media reported that Dr. Dumba had been involved in schemes to sabotage the U.S. munitions industry. On 5 September, the news broke that he had admitted to giving James Francis Jewell Archibald, an American news correspondent, a letter for delivery to Foreign Minister Baron Burián von Rajecz in Vienna. In the letter, he proposed certain measures to hamper the manufacture of munitions for the Allies in the US. The so-called 'Dumba Affair' quickly became a scandal. On 9 September 1915, Secretary of State Lansing declared him no longer acceptable and requested the Austro-Hungarian government to recall its ambassador. In the note, Lansing charged the ambassador with espionage for having advocated that his government back 'plans to instigate strikes in American manufacturing plants engaged in the production of munitions of war'. On 27 September, the Austro-Hungarian government eventually agreed to recall Dr. Dumba. He left the United States on 5 October and was allowed to pass unhindered through the Entente blockade of the European continent and return to Vienna.

Following his departure, the Austro-Hungarian embassy was led by a chargé d'affaires (Erich Freiherr Zwiedinek von Südenhorst). Count Tarnowski von Tarnów was named as his successor in November 1916 but never presented his credentials to President Wilson, thus making Dr. Dumba the last official ambassador of Austria-Hungary to the United States.

Upon his return to Vienna, Dumba retired from the diplomatic service. In May 1917, he was ennobled and appointed to the Upper House (Herrenhaus), but he would play no further prominent role in public life. With the abolition of nobility in Austria in 1919, Graf von Dumba lost his nobiliary title and particle. In his later years, he became a pacifist and wrote several books, including his memoirs which were published in 1932 and in which he defended his action during World War I.

Although much publicised at the time, Dr. Dumba was not the first foreign diplomat to be declared persona non grata by the U.S. government. In 1888, the British envoy Lord Sackville-West had been sacked following the publication of the so-called Murchison letter during the presidential campaign. It could also be noted that the Dumba Affair also included the military attaché at the German Embassy, Captain Franz von Papen, who was declared persona non grata in December 1915 and who would later play a prominent role in German politics in the 1930s.

Dr. Dumba died in Bodensdorf am Ossiacher See on 6 January 1947. He was the last surviving former ambassador of Austria-Hungary.

== Works ==
- Austria-Hungary and the War (together with Albert Graf Apponyi von Nagy-Appony, Ladislaus Freiherr Hengelmüller von Hengervár and Alexander Nuber von Pereked), New York, Austro-Hungarian Consulate-general, 1915.
- Zehn Jahre Völkerbund, 1930.
- Dreibund und Ententepolitik in der Alten und Neuen Welt, Zurich, Amalthea verlag, 1931 (Memoirs of a diplomat, translated by Ian Morrow, Boston, Little, Brown and Company, 1932.)

== Bibliography ==
- Gerald H. Davis, The Fall of Ambassador Dumba, Atlanta, Georgia State College, 1965.

Diplomatic posts
Preceded by Karl Freiherr Heidler von Egeregg und Syrgenstein	Austro-Hungarian Minister to Serbia; 1903–1905	Succeeded by Moritz Freiherr Czikann von Wahlborn
Preceded by Albert Freiherr Eperjesy von Szászváros und Tóti	Austro-Hungarian Minister to Sweden; 1909–1912	Succeeded by Maximilian Graf Hadik von Futak
Preceded by Ladislaus Freiherr Hengelmüller von Hengervár	Austro-Hungarian Ambassador to the United States; 1913–1915	Succeeded by Adam Graf Tarnowski von Tarnów
