= Brigate Fiamme Verdi =

Italian resistance group

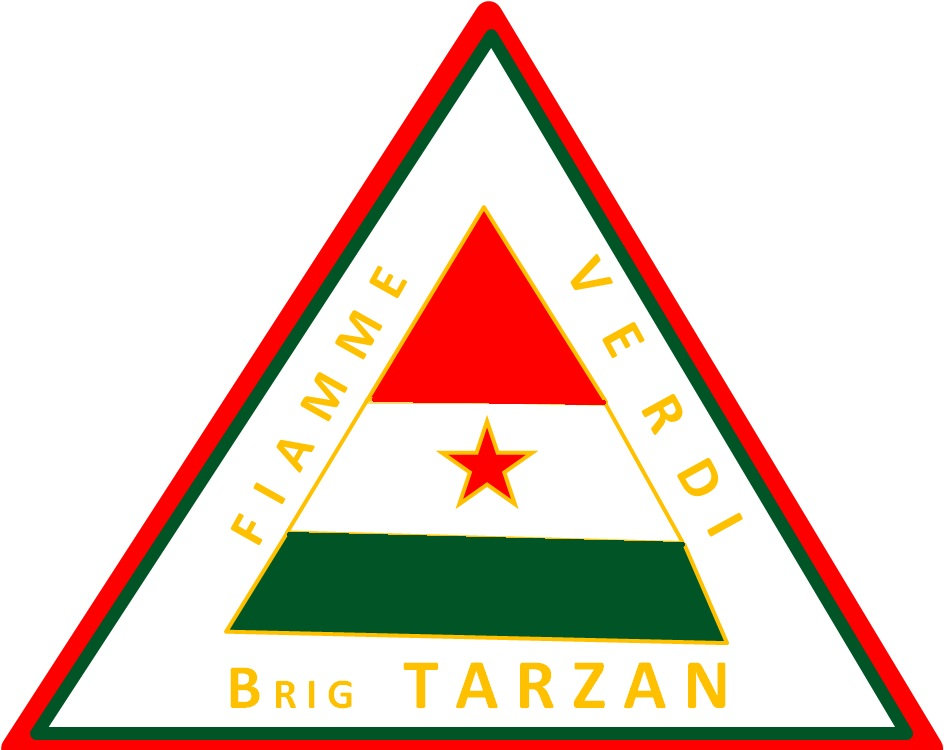
Fiamme Verdi Brigade Tarzan Emblem

The Brigate Fiamme Verdi (English: Green Flame Brigade) was an Italian Partisan Resistance Group, of predominantly Roman Catholic orientation, which operated in Italy during World War II.

The armed Italian Resistance comprised a number of contingents of differing ideological orientation - the largest being the Communist Brigate Garibaldi. Tensions between Catholics and anarchists, Communists and socialists in the movement led Catholics to form the Fiamme Verdi as a separate brigade of Christian Democrats in Northern Italy. Peter Hebblethwaite wrote that, by early 1944, some 20,000 partisans had emerged from Catholic Action. Known as the "Green Flames", they were supported by sympathetic provincial clergy in the North, who pronounced the Germans to be "unjust invaders", whom it was lawful and meritorious to repel. "Bishops tended to be more cautious", wrote Hebblethwaite, Maurilio Fossati, the Cardinal Archbishop of Turin "visited partisan units in the mountains, heard their confessions and said Mass for them."

The Fiamme Verdi did not belong to the approximately 4% of Italian Resistance groups that were formal Catholic organisations, but instead was classed in the 21% of resistance groups that were "independent", in which, like the Osoppo group and others, the Fiamme Verdi was not formally a Catholic group, but had a very strong Catholic presence. Nevertheless, just as there were militant Catholics within the Garibaldi Brigade, so there were non-Catholics within the Fiamme Verdi. 191 priests were killed by fascists and 125 by the Germans, while 109 were killed by partisans. Though some priests joined pro-fascist bands, the Vatican backed the so-called anti-Fascist 'partisan chaplains' and 'red priests' fighting with the partisans, hoping that they would provide religious guidance to partisans being exposed to Communist propaganda.

The Fiamme Verdi was sometimes associated with the Democrazia Cristiana Party and was particularly active in Emilia and Lombardia. Notable members included Lionello Levi Sandri, who later served as a prominent Italian and European Commissioner.

== See also ==
- Anti-fascism
- Catholic Church and Nazi Germany
- Christian Democracy (Italy)
- Italian Civil War
- National Liberation Committee
- Rovetta massacre
