= Lajos Széchényi =

Hungarian diplomat

Ludwig Graf Széchényi von Sárvár und Felsövidék

Austro-Hungarian Minister to Bulgaria
- In office 19 November 1916 – 24 January 1917
- Preceded by: Adam Graf Tarnowski von Tarnów
- Succeeded by: Otto Graf Czernin von und zu Chudenitz

Austro-Hungarian Minister to the Netherlands
- In office 24 January 1917 – 11 November 1918
- Preceded by: Karl Freiherr von Giskra
- Succeeded by: None

Personal details
- Born: 28 March 1868 Gyönk, Austria-Hungary (now Hungary)
- Died: 14 April 1919 (aged 51) Kaltenleutgeben, Austria

Count Lajos Széchényi de Sárvár-Felsővidék (German: Ludwig Graf Széchényi von Sárvár und Felsövidék; 28 March 1868 – 14 April 1919) was a Hungarian diplomat of Austria-Hungary serving as envoy to Bulgaria and the Netherlands during World War I.

== Life ==
Born in Gyönk on 28 March 1868 into a prominent Hungarian noble family. His older brother Bertalan (1866–1943) was a politician who served in the Hungarian House of Magnates and his uncle Imre (1825–1898) served as Ambassador to Germany from 1878 to 1892.

Count Széchényi entered the Austro-Hungarian foreign service in 1892 and served subsequently in Brussels, Washington D.C., Rome, St. Petersburg and London.

In 1909, Count Széchényi was selected to lead the diplomatic agency in Cairo with the title of Consul-General and remained in charge until the outbreak of war in 1914 when it was dissolved. During World War I, he entered military service and served in Serbia.

In November 1916, Count Széchényi was appointed Minister of the Dual Monarchy at Sofia to succeed Count Tarnowski who had been appointed Ambassador to the United States. However, he was transferred to The Hague already in January the following year to make place in Sofia for Count Otto von Czernin, the younger brother of the Imperial Foreign Minister Count Ottokar von Czernin, and remained there until the end of the war, being accredited also to Luxembourg.

After having lost much of his estates after the war, Count Széchényi died at Kaltenleutgeben on 14 April 1919 at the age of 51.

Diplomatic posts
Preceded by Adam Graf Tarnówski von Tarnów	Austro-Hungarian Minister to Bulgaria; 1916–1917	Succeeded by Otto Graf Czernin von und zu Chudenitz
Preceded by Karl Freiherr von Giskra	Austro-Hungarian Minister to the Netherlands; 1917–1918	Succeeded by None
