= Dymokury =

- Municipality
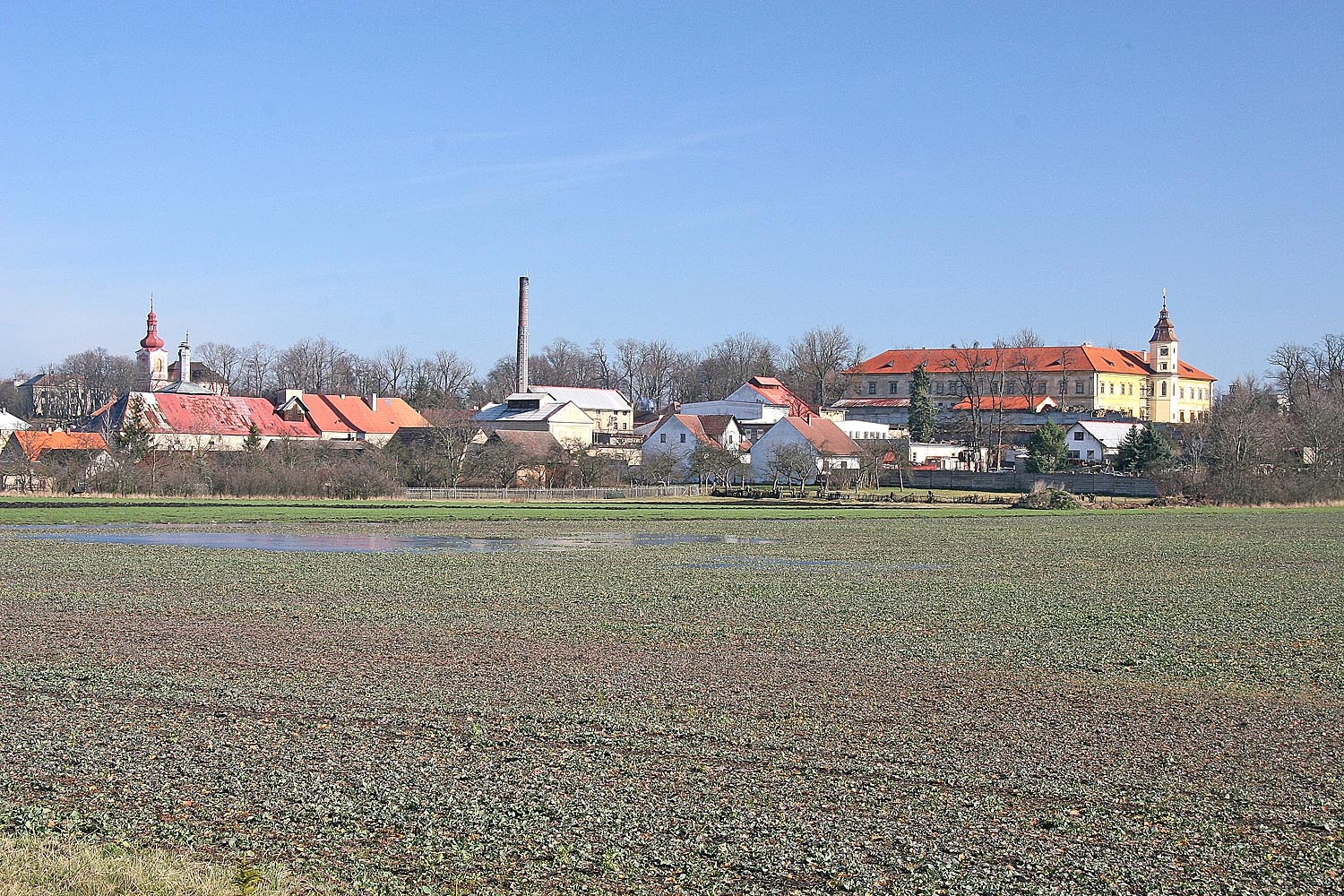
- View from the southwest

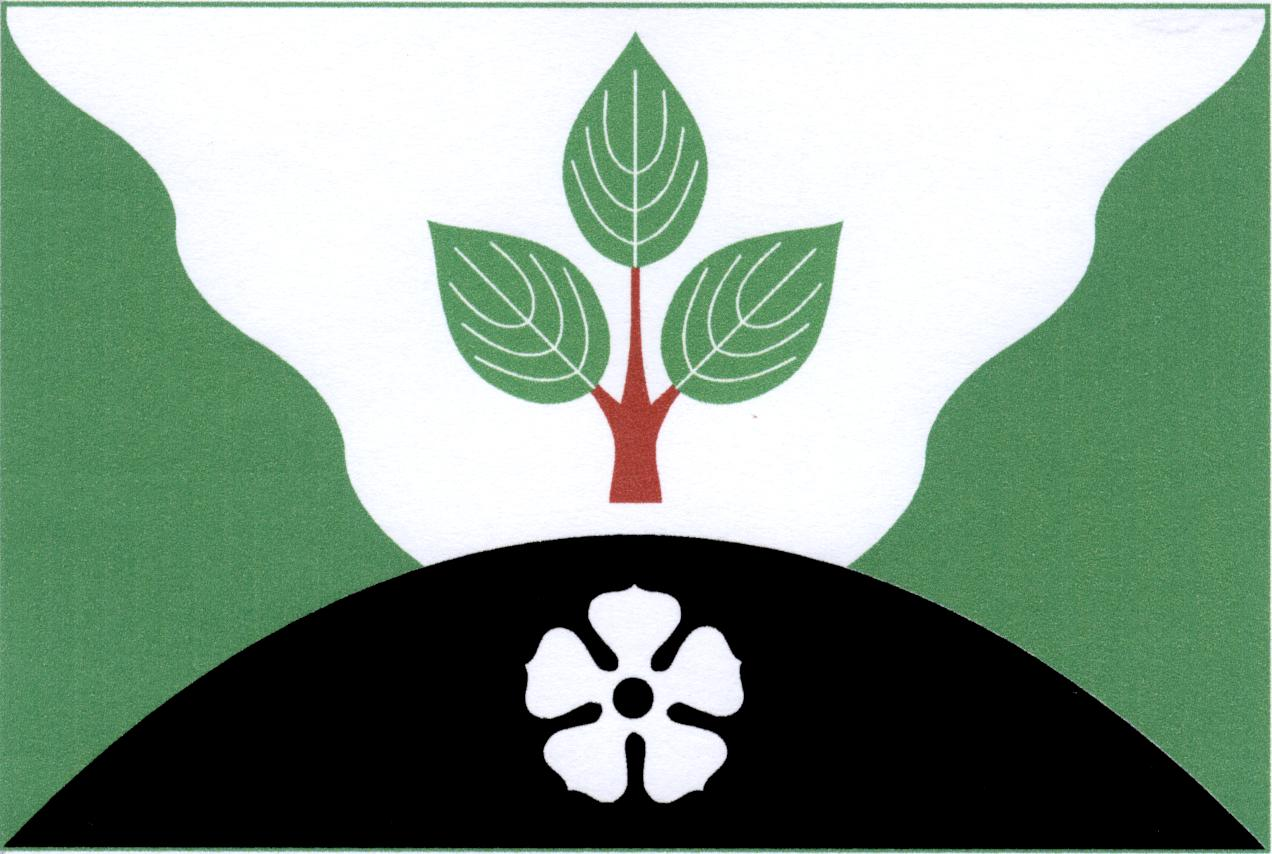
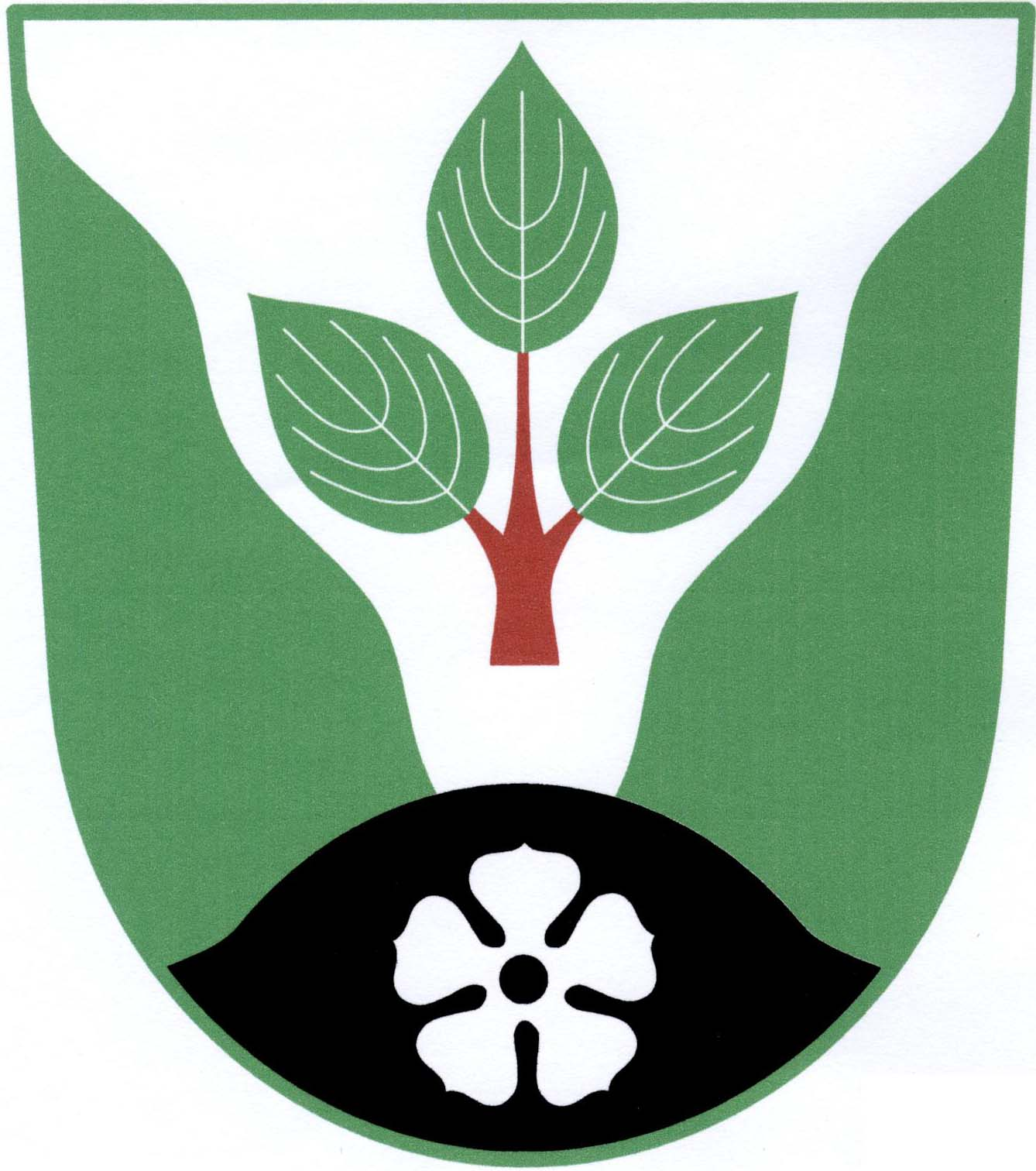
- Flag Coat of arms

- Location in the Czech Republic
- Coordinates: 50°14′45″N 15°12′9″E
- Country: Czech Republic
- Region: Central Bohemian
- District: Nymburk
- First mentioned: 1249

Area
  - Total: 14.65 km^{2} (5.66 sq mi)
- Elevation: 203 m (666 ft)

Population (2026-01-01)
  - Total: 919
  - Density: 62.7/km^{2} (162/sq mi)
- Time zone: UTC+1 (CET)
  - Summer (DST): UTC+2 (CEST)
- Postal code: 289 01
- Website: www.dymokury.cz

Dymokury (German: Dimokur) is a municipality and village in Nymburk District in the Central Bohemian Region of the Czech Republic. It has about 900 inhabitants.

== Administrative division ==
Dymokury consists of three municipal parts (in brackets population according to the 2021 census):

- Dymokury (675)
- Černá Hora (69)
- Svídnice (108)

== Etymology ==
The name is derived from the Czech words dým ('smoke') and kouřit ('to smoke'). Dymokur was probably the designation of a person performing such an activity (e.g. when burning grass as protection against mosquitoes), and Dymokury was the designation of the village of such people.

== Geography ==
Dymokury is located about 13 kilometres (8 mi) northeast of Nymburk and 49 km (30 mi) west of Prague. It lies in the Central Elbe Table. Two streams, Pivovarský potok and Štítarský potok, flow through the municipality. The fishpond Pustý rybník in the municipality is supplied by the Štítarský potok.

== History ==
The first written mention of Dymokury is from 1249, when it was a possession of a local noble named Soběslav. In 1290, King Wenceslaus II ceded the estates to the Cistercian monks of the Sedlec Abbey near Kutná Hora. After changing owners several times, the fief was purchased by the noble House of Waldstein in 1573, their successors had a Renaissance castle erected from 1614 onwards.

Disseized by Emperor Ferdinand II after the 1620 Battle of White Mountain, Dymokury was acquired by Albrecht von Wallenstein, who nevertheless sold it to the Austrian Khuen von Belasi dynasty shortly afterwards. They resold it to Guillaume de Lamboy, Baron of Cortesheim. From 1673, the House of Colloredo held the estate, which also included the neighbouring town of Městec Králové. They had the castle again rebuilt in a Baroque style, finished in 1787. The last noble owners were the Czernin family, who were expropriated and expelled after World War II, but regained its possession. The castle was restored after the Velvet Revolution of 1989.

== Demographics ==
Historical population

Year	Pop.	±%
1869	1,306	—
1880	1,744	+33.5%
1890	1,664	−4.6%
1900	1,672	+0.5%
1910	1,737	+3.9%

Year	Pop.	±%
1921	1,715	−1.3%
1930	1,634	−4.7%
1950	1,356	−17.0%
1961	1,228	−9.4%
1970	1,087	−11.5%

Year	Pop.	±%
1980	901	−17.1%
1991	798	−11.4%
2001	762	−4.5%
2011	860	+12.9%
2021	852	−0.9%

Source: Censuses

== Transport ==
The I/32 road, which connect the D11 motorway with Jičín, runs east of Dymokury. The railway that passes through the municipality is unused.

== Sights ==
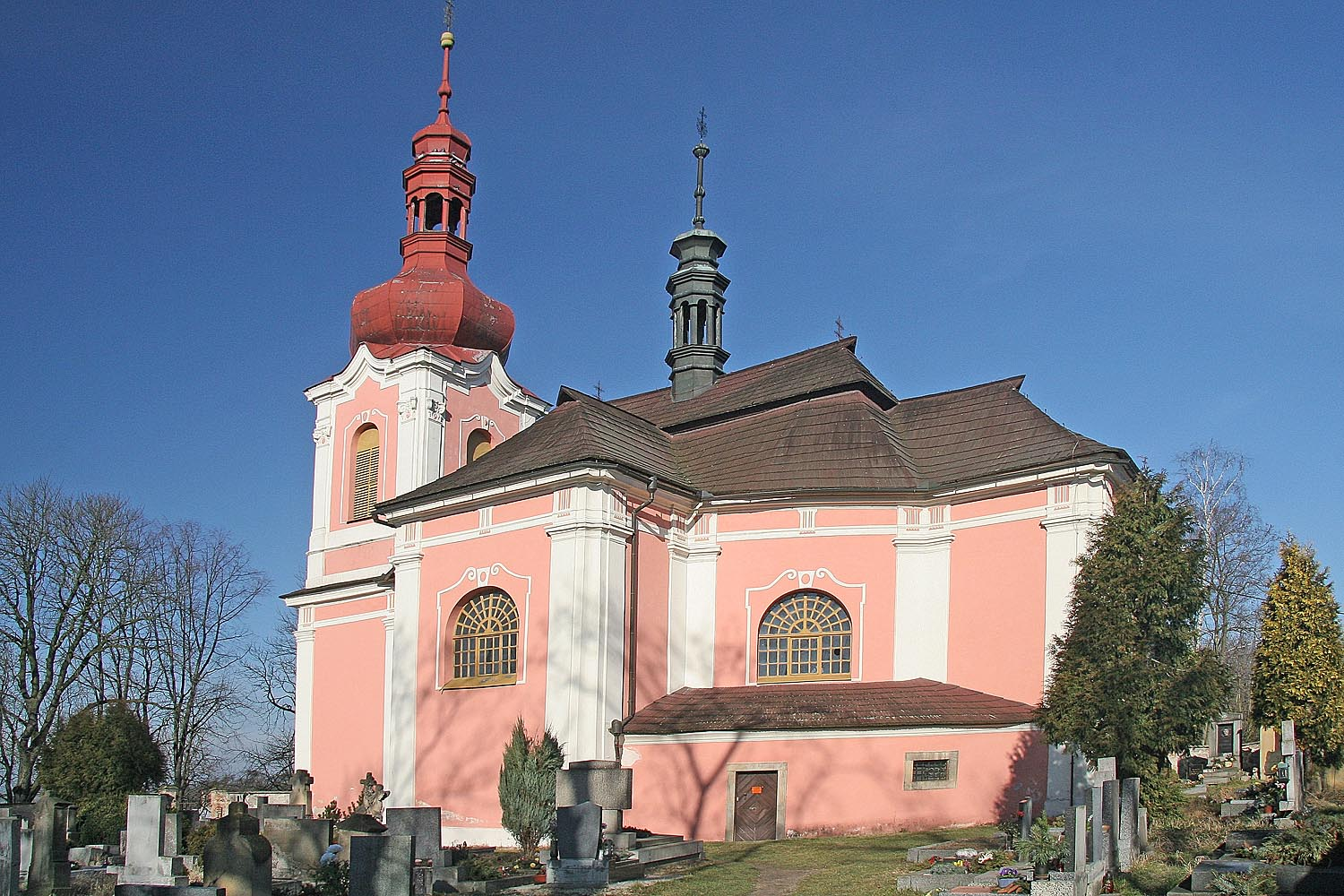
Church of the Annunciation of the Virgin Mary

The main landmark of Dymokury is the Church of the Annunciation of the Virgin Mary. The first church in Dymokury was documented in the 14th century, it was destroyed during the Thirty Years' War. The current church was then built in the Baroque style in 1723–1725. It was probably designed by Jan Santini Aichel.

== Notable people ==
- Ottokar Czernin (1872–1932), nobleman, diplomat and politician
- Count Otto von Czernin (1875–1962), nobleman and diplomat
