= Adam Tarnowski (senior) =

Austro-Hungarian diplomat of Polish origin

Adam Graf Tarnowski von Tarnów
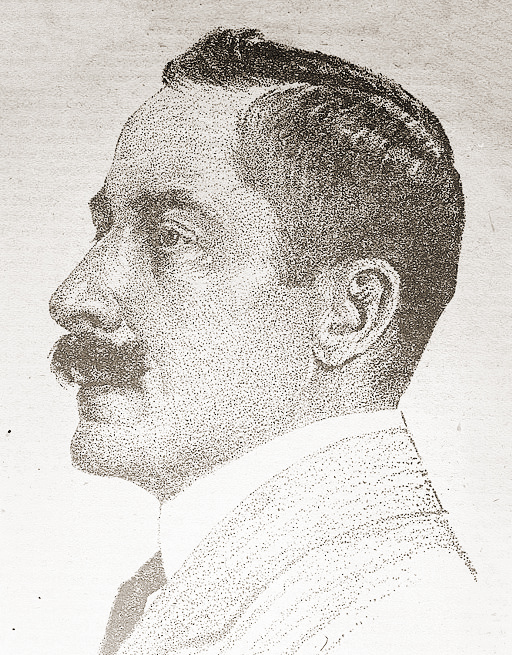

Austro-Hungarian Minister to Bulgaria
- In office 30 April 1911 – 9 November 1916
- Preceded by: Karl Freiherr von Giskra
- Succeeded by: Ludwig Graf Széchényi von Sárvár und Felsövidék

Austro-Hungarian Ambassador to the United States
- In office 9 November 1916 – 8 April 1917
- Preceded by: Konstantin Dumba
- Succeeded by: None

Personal details
- Born: 4 March 1866 Kraków, Austria-Hungary (now Poland)
- Died: 10 October 1946 (aged 80) Lausanne, Switzerland
- Spouse(s): Marie, née Prinzessin Światopełk-Czetwertyńska (1880–1965)

Adam Graf Tarnowski von Tarnów (4 March 1866 – 10 October 1946) was an Austro-Hungarian diplomat of Polish origin who served during World War I.

== Life ==
Born in Kraków on 4 March 1866 into an old family of the Polish aristocracy, Adam Graf Tarnowski von Tarnów married Princess Marie Światopełk-Czetwertyńska (1880–1965) in Warsaw on 10 September 1901.

Count Tarnowski entered the Austro-Hungarian Foreign Service in 1897. He was appointed to the Austro-Hungarian Embassy in Washington D.C. in 1899 and remained there until 1901, when he was transferred to Paris. In 1907, he was promoted to Counselor and dispatched to Madrid. In 1909, he was transferred to London.

On 30 April 1911, he was appointed Minister of the Dual Monarchy at Sofia. During the war, he was said to have exerted a major influence on King Ferdinand I of Bulgaria and played a prominent role in securing Bulgaria's entry into the war on the side of the Central Powers in October 1915.

In 1913 he was appointed Grand Cross of the Order of Franz Joseph.

In late 1915, Konstantin Dumba, who served as the Austro-Hungarian Ambassador to Washington D.C., was declared persona non grata and expelled from the country. On 9 November 1916, the Austro-Hungarian government decided to appoint Count Tarnowski as his replacement. This was considered a fitting appointment, as he had a reputation for being one of the most accomplished and talented diplomats in the Dual Monarchy's service.

Count Tarnowski arrived in the United States on 31 January 1917, as Britain initially refused to grant him safe conduct through the Entente naval blockade. Furthermore, his arrival coincided with the delivery of the German note announcing the resumption of unrestricted submarine warfare, prompting President Woodrow Wilson to refuse to receive him. After the U.S. declaration of war on Germany on 8 April, Austria-Hungary severed diplomatic relations, meaning Tarnowski was never able to present his credentials. He sailed from the United States on 4 May, along with other diplomatic staff. The United States formally declared war on Austria-Hungary in December 1917.

In 1917, Count Tarnowski was considered for the post of Minister to Stockholm, but as events in his native Poland unfolded, he never took up the position. In September 1917, he declined an offer to join the Regency Council of the newly founded Kingdom of Poland (1916–1918), but was later proposed to become the first Prime Minister. His nomination, however, was vetoed by Germany due to his alleged pro-Austrian sympathies.

After the war, Tarnowski retired from public service. Despite common misconception, he was not the father of diplomat and Foreign Minister in the Polish government-in-exile, Adam (1892–1956).

Count Tarnowski died in Lausanne on 10 October 1946.

Diplomatic posts
Preceded by Karl Freiherr von Giskra	Austro-Hungarian Minister to Bulgaria; 1911–1916	Succeeded by Ludwig Graf Széchényi von Sárvár und Felsövidék
Preceded by Konstantin Dumba	Austro-Hungarian Ambassador to the United States; 1916–1917	Succeeded by None
