= Adam Tarnowski (minister) =

Austro-Hungarian and Polish diplomat

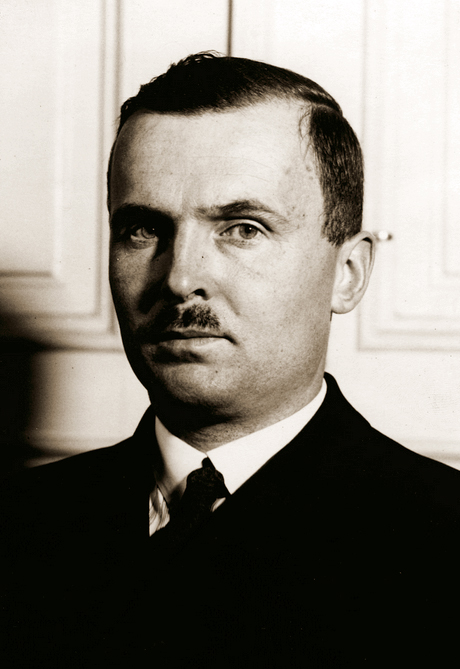
Adam Tarnowski

Adam Tarnowski (2 March 1892 – 9 May 1956), was an Austro-Hungarian and Polish diplomat. He was the minister of foreign affairs in the Polish government in exile from 1944 to 1949.

Despite common misconception, he was not a son of Austro-Hungarian diplomat Adam Tarnowski (1866-1946).
