= Chroust =

Chroust (feminine: Chroustová) is a Czech surname, meaning 'cockchafer'. Notable people with the surname include:

- Anton-Hermann Chroust (1907–1982), German-American jurist, philosopher and historian
- Gerhard Chroust (born 1941), Austrian systems scientist
