= Count Manfred Beckett Czernin =

Fourth son of Count Otto von Czernin

- Born: Graf Manfred Maria Edmund Ralph Beckett Czernin von und zu Chudenitz; 18 January 1913; Berlin, Kingdom of Prussia, German Empire
- Died: 6 October 1962 (aged 49); London, England
- Relatives: Count Otto von Czernin (father)
- Military career
- Allegiance: United Kingdom
- Branch: Royal Air Force
- Service years: 1935–1945
- Rank: Squadron Leader
- Service number: 37148
- Units: No. 57 Squadron RAF; No. 504 Squadron RAF; No. 213 Squadron RAF; No. 85 Squadron RAF; No. 17 Squadron RAF; No. 146 Squadron RAF; Special Operations Executive
- Conflicts: Second World War: Battle of France; Battle of Britain; Italian campaign
- Awards: Distinguished Service Order; Military Cross; Distinguished Flying Cross; Mentioned in Despatches
- Other work: FIAT sales manager

Count Manfred Beckett Czernin, DSO, MC, DFC (18 January 1913 – 6 October 1962) was a Royal Air Force pilot and later an operative with the Special Operations Executive in the Second World War.

== Early life ==
Czernin was the fourth son of Count Otto von Czernin, an Austrian diplomat, and his English wife, the Hon. Lucy Beckett, daughter of Ernest Beckett, 2nd Baron Grimthorpe. Several years after he was born, his parents were divorced. Young Manfred moved to Italy with his mother, but he was educated in the United Kingdom at Oundle School. In September 1931, he moved to Rhodesia to work on a tobacco plantation.

On 26 November 1931, he officially changed his name from Count Manfred Marie Edmund Ralph Czernin to Manfred Beckett. However, on 27 November 1936, he changed his name from Manfred Beckett to Count Manfred Beckett Czernin.

== Royal Air Force ==
Czernin returned to the United Kingdom in April 1935 to take up an appointment as an acting pilot officer on a short service commission in the Royal Air Force (RAF). Qualifying as a pilot, he was posted to No. 57 Squadron RAF at RAF Upper Heyford, and he enjoyed several more squadron postings until placed on the Class A Reserve on 16 August 1937.

Recalled on the outbreak of hostilities, Czernin passed a fighter pilot assessment course and was posted to No. 504 Squadron at RAF Debden in January 1940. A few days later, he was transferred to No. 213 Squadron at RAF Wittering and in May to No.85 Squadron, flying Hurricanes.

Like others in the British Expeditionary Force, this unit had a hard time fighting against the German Luftwaffe. On 16 May, Czernin had to walk back to his squadron at Lille Airport after force-landing his aircraft, damaged by a Messerschmitt Bf 109 of 3/JG76. On 19 May, he shot down a Heinkel He 111 and two Dornier Do 17, and a Henschel Hs 126 the next day, adding one more Heinkel 111 to his tally on 12 May before he returned again to England on 21 May by boat. Upon his return, he was posted to No. 17 Squadron at RAF Martlesham Heath.

== One of "The Few" ==
Still with No. 17 Squadron, Czernin fought with distinction throughout the Battle of Britain, tallying a Do 17 of II/KG2 on 12 July (shared), which crashed into the sea near a convoy off Orfordness. In the following month, he shared a Ju 88 on 21 July and got three Bf 110s (including one shared) on 25 July. Later on, Czernin shot down two more Bf 110s on 3 September, a Bf 109 and two shared Heinkel 111s on 5 September, a Bf 110 on 11 September, a Ju 88 shared on 19 September and one more Bf 110 on 27 September, and a Do 17 shared on 24 October.

Czernin himself was shot down on 17 November by German ace Adolf Galland in a combat over RAF Wattisham. Despite being wounded, Czernin managed to escape by parachute. His Hurricane crashed just west of Bradfield Church.

In May 1941, he was posted to an Operational Training Unit at RAF Debden and promoted to acting squadron leader in December. In February 1942, he was given command of No. 146 Squadron RAF, in India, and later on was posted to HQ No. 224 Group as a Staff Officer. He returned to the United Kingdom to take up a similar posting at HQ No. 28 Group, RAF Uxbridge, until he was recruited by Special Operations Executive (SOE) under the cover of another similar assignment.

== Special Operations in Italy ==
Czernin was parachuted into northern Italy, not far from the Austrian border, on the night of 13 June 1944, winning in the process a Military Cross for his decision to go ahead with the jump in spite of dubious signalling from the "welcome party" on the ground: it was not infrequent for the Germans to try to intercept Allied airdrops to get hold of both of men and supplies directed to the Italian Resistance. A fluent speaker of Italian, Czernin operated from a farmhouse in the Tramonti area near Pordenone, and he set up a very effective Partisan network before being picked up by a Lysander special operations aircraft and flown back to Bari at the end of the year.

His second mission took place in March 1945 when he parachuted in Lombardy, taking command of the operations that led to the surrender of Bergamo.

== Post-war ==
Discharged from the RAF as a squadron leader in October 1945, he became sales manager for Fiat in England. He died suddenly on 6 October 1962.

== Awards ==
The citation for Czernin's Distinguished Flying Cross cited his "great keenness in his desire to engage the enemy" and specifically mentioned that in August 1940, "he led his section in a head-on attack on large formations of enemy aircraft, destroying three of them."

His citation for the Military Cross reads:

On the night of 12–13 June 1944, Squadron Leader Czernin and his Wireless operator were to be dropped into enemy-occupied territory, but the reception signals were not satisfactory and they returned to base. On the following night, the reception was again incorrect. Entirely regardless of his own safety, Squadron Leader Czernin decided to jump with a view to making a personal reconnaissance of the situation. This he did without arms of any description and with the full knowledge that the Germans are constantly arranging bogus receptions for the receipt of Allied personnel and stores. On landing, he found the reception committee to be friendly. Thereupon he flashed a signal to the aircraft which dropped the Wireless Operator and equipment. But for this courageous action, a most vital operation would have had to be postponed at a stage when the time was of the utmost importance to the success of the major plan.

The Distinguished Service Order (DSO) was awarded for activities behind the enemy lines from March to April 1945. Directed to "co-ordinate the various scattered Partisan units into a unified command", which was to "carry out the directions of 15 Army Group", he was parachuted in. To reach the Bergamasco area, he had to cross the 9,000 ft (2,700 m) Passo del Diavolo, which was six feet deep in snow. On the move for 24 hours in the cold, he suffered frostbite but crossed it on 4 April – his third attempt. Throughout his "energy and personality", he "quickly built up a large aggressive Partisan Command". The Partisans then began operations on 28 April 1945. Three enemy garrisons surrendered unconditionally, and another three were captured or "eliminated". This was followed by the surrender of Bergamo.

Czernin and the leader of the Partisans initially demanded unconditional surrender of the Germans. Boldly driving into the city in a car "draped with the Union Jack", they had to withdraw after the Germans fired upon them. He ordered an attack on the city simultaneously with the underground elements within Bergamo. In the morning of 28 April 1945, Czernin obtained the unconditional surrender. The DSO citation said that he "displayed the highest qualities of leadership and by his courage and daring made a notable contribution to the Allied success in North Italy."

== See also ==
- Czernin von und zu Chudenitz
- Rovetta massacre

== Bibliography ==
- Franks, Norman L. R. (1976). Double Mission. RAF fighter Ace and SOE Agent, Manfred Czernin, DSO, MC, DFC. London: Kimber. ISBN 0-7183-0254-0.
