= Humprecht Jan Czernin =

Humprecht Jan Cernin
- Humprecht Jan Černín
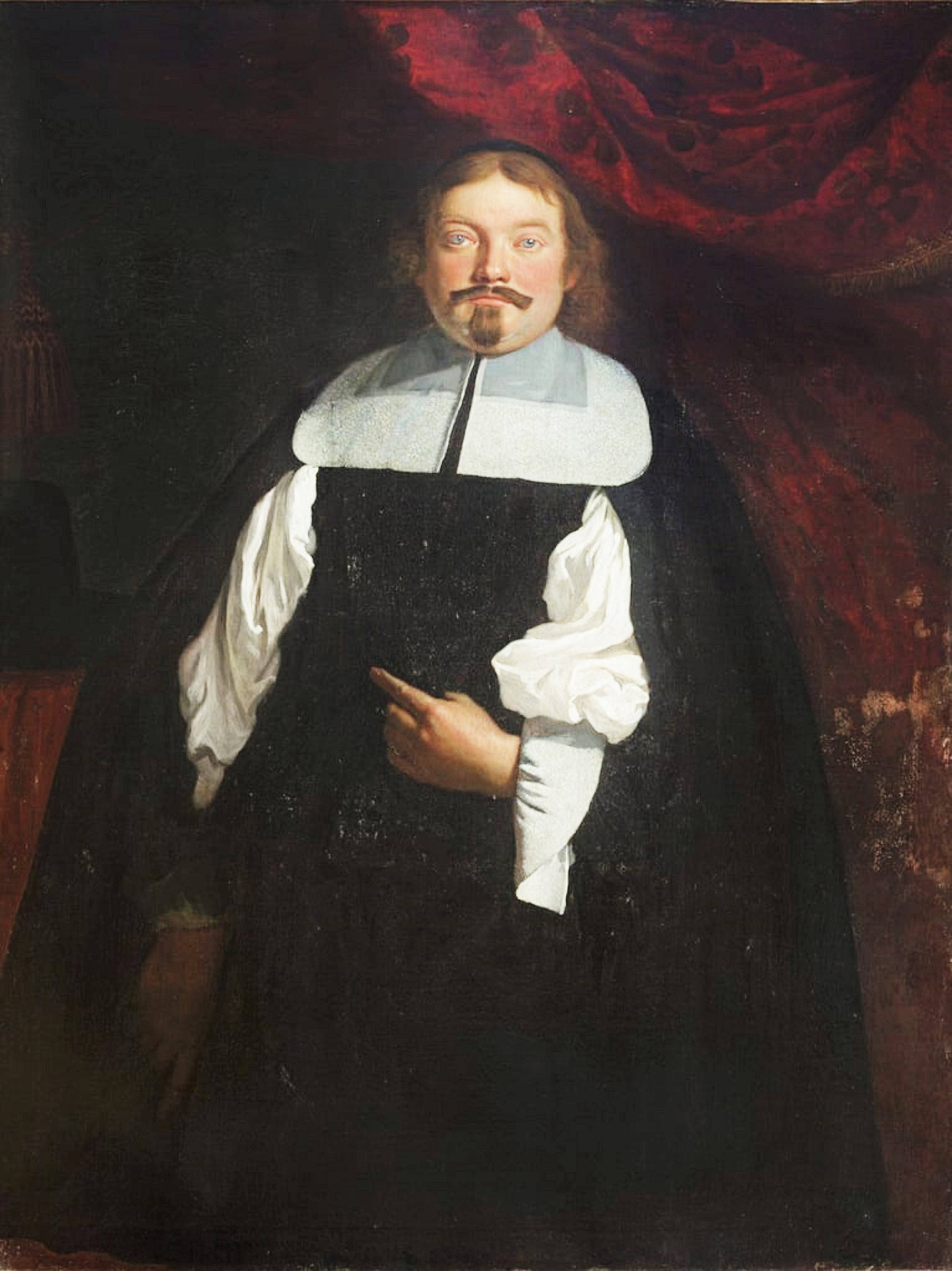
- Portrait of Humprecht Jan Černín by Karel Škréta
- Born: 14 February 1628; Radenín, Bohemia
- Died: 3 March 1682 (aged 54); Kosmonosy, Bohemia
- Occupations: Nobleman, diplomat, art collector
- Known for: Czernin Palace; Humprecht Castle
- Spouse: Diana Maria di Gazoldo
- Family: Czernin family

Humprecht Jan Czernin (in Czech: Humprecht Jan Černín; February 14, 1628 - 1682) was a Bohemian aristocrat, diplomat, art collector, and art patron. Being a representative of the Czernin dynasty, he was an ambassador of the Habsburg monarchy to the Republic of Venice between 1660 and 1663 under Emperor Leopold I. The other notable facts about Cernin include being an owner of the palace, which was named Czernin Palace, and having a vast collection of Italian paintings.

== Early life and career ==
Cernin was born in 1628 in Radenín in Bohemia. He was the son of Jan Czernin of Chudenice, who was a regional administrator, and Zuzana Homutová of Harasov. He was brought up in the Radenin castle and studied at a Jesuit school in Prague.

During the years from 1645 to 1648, he made a Grand Tour of Italy, France, and the other Countries. The tour introduced him to the cultural life, architecture, and art of Europe. Then he became employed by Archduke Leopold, who later became the Emperor Leopold I, and he formed a good relationship with him. His associations at the court contributed to the development of his diplomatic career.

In 1652, he married Diana Maria di Gazoldo, who was connected to the court of Gonzaga in Mantua. Thus, his associations with Italy increased. His property and inheritance were sources of his wealth, which he needed for his diplomatic and cultural activities.

=== Diplomatic career ===
The Count of Cernin was made imperial ambassador to the Republic of Venice in November 1660 by Leopold I. He reached Venice in December of that year. His diplomatic mission continued up until 1663 and comprised representation of the Habsburgs at the court of Venice.

His visit was marked by the issue of diplomatic precedence between the imperial ambassador and representatives of the Venetian Republic. It concerned the sequence of ceremonies for the visit of the ambassador and also for the visit of his envoy from the Venetian Senate. After negotiations between the imperial court, a compromise was finally found and Cernin performed the ceremony of his diplomatic entry to Venice on 3 and 4 May 1661.

In addition to that, while serving as diplomat, Cernin also managed to establish contacts with the Italian painters and dealers. The letters to Leopold I give the evidence of his relationship with the emperor while on the Venetian legation.

=== Collection of artworks and patronage ===
Cernin became an important collector and patron of art of the seventeenth century Italy. During his years in Venice, he put together a collection that included paintings and copies of the masterpieces created by famous artists such as Raphael, Correggio, Guido Reni, Guercino, Titian, Paolo Veronese and Tintoretto. Cernin controlled acquisitions, commissions for paintings and instructed artists on the subjects of paintings.

At the time when he finished his diplomatic mission, his collection consisted of almost 300 paintings. The collection was relocated to his Prague house and turned out to be one of the important aristocratic art collections in the Bohemian lands. After his death, the collection got scattered between various private and museum collections.

=== Architectural projects ===
The Czernin Palace was built for the Cernins as an imposing family seat. Cernin obtained the land in 1666, but required an architect capable of implementing the project. In November 1667, he chose to collaborate with Francesco Caratti, an Italian architect. Building started in Cernin’s lifetime, and the exterior facade was erected by 1673. Further construction and interior decoration of the palace took place after Cernin’s death, led by his successors and other architects.

He also initiated the construction of the Humprecht Castle, near Sobotka, which was built as a baroque castle from 1666-68. This castle is named after him.

== Death ==
Cernin died in 1682 in Kosmonosy, Bohemia. After his death, his sons and heirs proceeded with the construction of Czernin palace, whereas his rich collection of paintings was dispersed slowly.
