= Czernin family =

Czech noble family

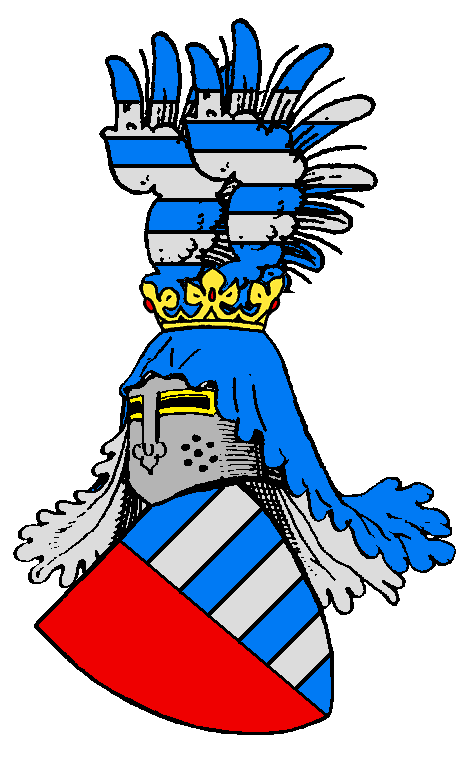
The original arms of the family

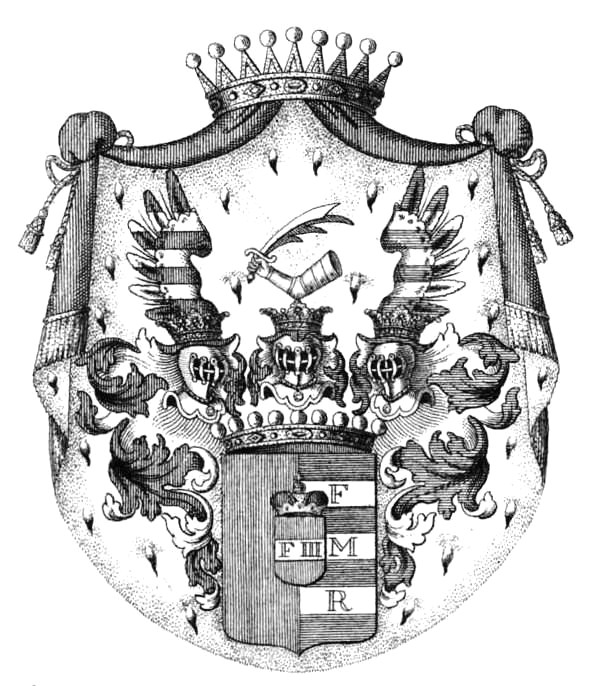
Coat of arms of the Counts Czernin von und zu Chudenitz

The Czernin family (Czech: Černínové z Chudenic; German: Czernin von und zu Chudenitz) is a Czech noble family that was one of the oldest and most prominent noble families in the Kingdom of Bohemia. The family was related to the most distinguished noble families of the region. Through matrilinear inheritance, a branch of the family has been integrated into the British nobility, with the title of Baron Howard de Walden currently held by Count Peter Czernin von und zu Chudenitz.

== History ==
The family is descended from the clan of "Drslavici", like several other Bohemian families. The first known bearer of the family name was Comes and Camerarius regis (1199–1212) Cernin de Chudenic (11??–12??). The name of the family refers to the town of Chudenice (German: Chudenitz) in western Bohemia, which was in their possession from the 13th century until 1945.

On 18 May 1607, the Czernin family was elevated to the Reichsfreiherrenstand with the title of Freiherr von Chudenitz (Baron of Chudenitz; svobodný pán z Chudenic) and, on 15 March 1623, to the Reichsgrafenstand with the title of Reichsgraf von Chudenitz (Count of Chudenitz; hrabě z Chudenic).

In 1716, Franz Josef, Count Czernin von und zu Chudenitz, received permission from the Emperor to the hereditary title of Regierer des Hauses Neuhaus (Ruler of the House of Hradec).

Today, most members of the Czernin family live in the Czech Republic, Austria, and the United Kingdom.

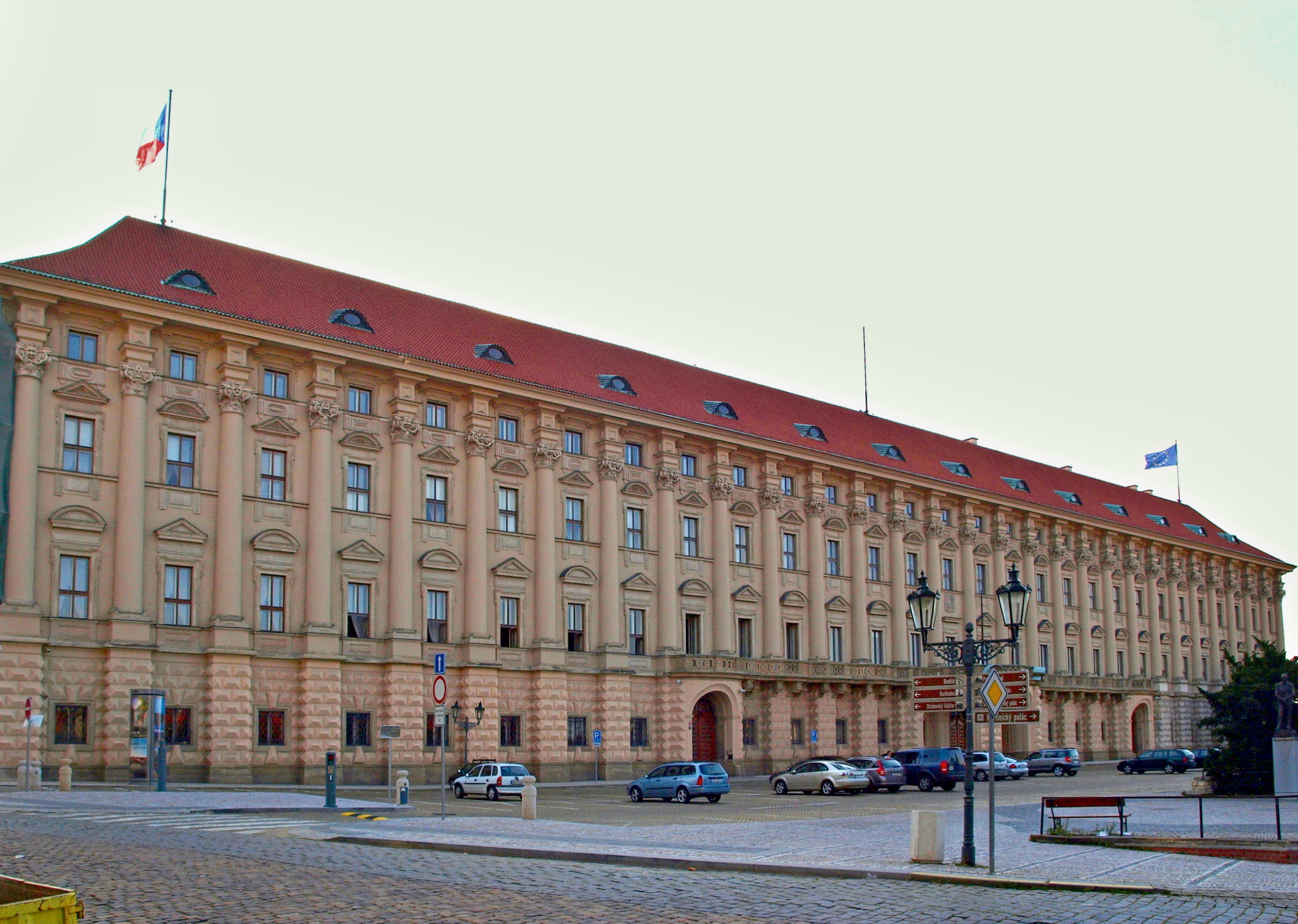
Czernin Palace in Prague

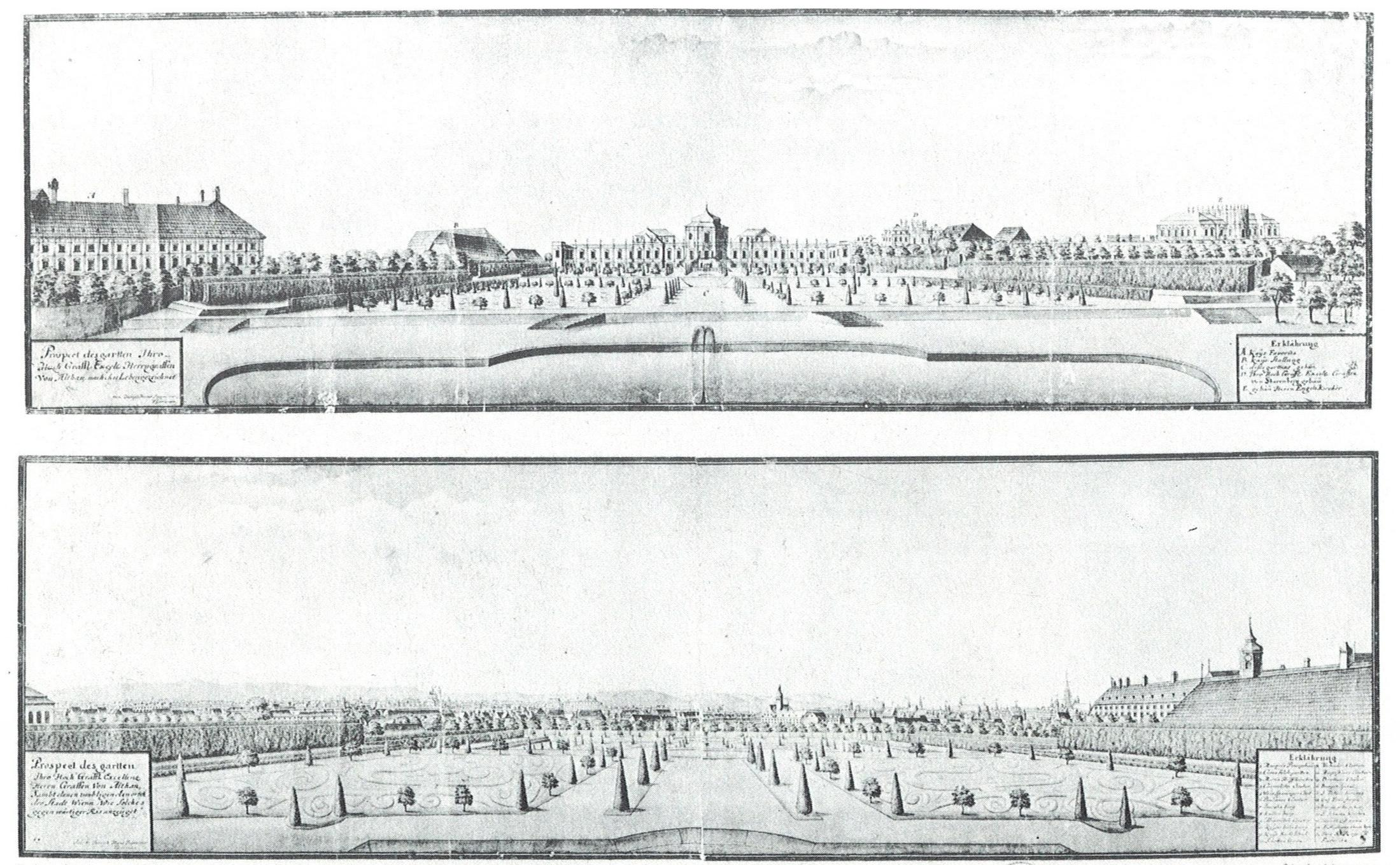
Palais Czernin-Althann in Vienna

== Legend ==
It is said that about 1000 years ago, the king had a conflict with a Bohemian nobleman. He was so angry with him that he sent his troops into the nobleman's castle. The soldiers murdered the whole family except a baby boy, whose nurse had hidden him in a kettle in the kitchen. When the soldiers withdrew, people found the little child in the kettle, and they praised God for this miracle. They called the boy Czernin, which means "The Black" in Czech, because he was black all over his face after having lain in the kettle. The king was so impressed by the people's loyalty that he pardoned the little Czernin.

== Notable family members ==
- Humprecht Jan, Count Czernin of Chudenicz (1628–1682), Habsburg imperial ambassador to Venice and Rome
- Johann Rudolf Czernin von und zu Chudenitz (1757–1845), Austrian civil servant and theatre director
- Count Ottokar Czernin von und zu Chudenitz (1872–1932), Austro-Hungarian politician and diplomat
- Count Otto Czernin von und zu Chudenitz (1875–1962), Austro-Hungarian diplomat and brother of Ottokar
- Count Manfred Beckett Czernin (1913–1962), Otto's son; British World War II pilot and spy
- Vera Fugger von Babenhausen, née Countess Czernin, married Austrian chancellor Kurt Schuschnigg shortly after he was deposed in 1938.
- Franz Josef Czernin (born 1952), Austrian poet
- Hubertus Czernin (1956–2006), Austrian journalist
- Tomáš Czernin (born 1962), Czech politician
- Monika Czernin (born 1965), Austrian writer, screenwriter and film director
- Thomas Czernin-Morzin (born 1966), Austrian investor and businessman
- Peter Czernin (born 1966), British film producer and the 11th Baron Howard de Walden
- Countess Michelle Czernin von und zu Chudenitz Morzin (born 1969), award-winning motion picture producer

== Sources ==
- Genealogisches Handbuch des Adels, Gräfliche Häuser Band XII
