= Kálnoky =

Kálnoky is a Hungarian surname meaning "from Kálnok" (Romanian: Calnic, now Covasna County). Notable people with the surname include:

- the House of Kálnoky;
- Gustav Kálnoky, Hungarian statesman
- László Kálnoky, a Hungarian poet
- Tomas Kalnoky, Czech-born American musician

== See also ==
- List of titled noble families in the Kingdom of Hungary
