= Sámuel Kálnoky =

Chancellor of Transylvania

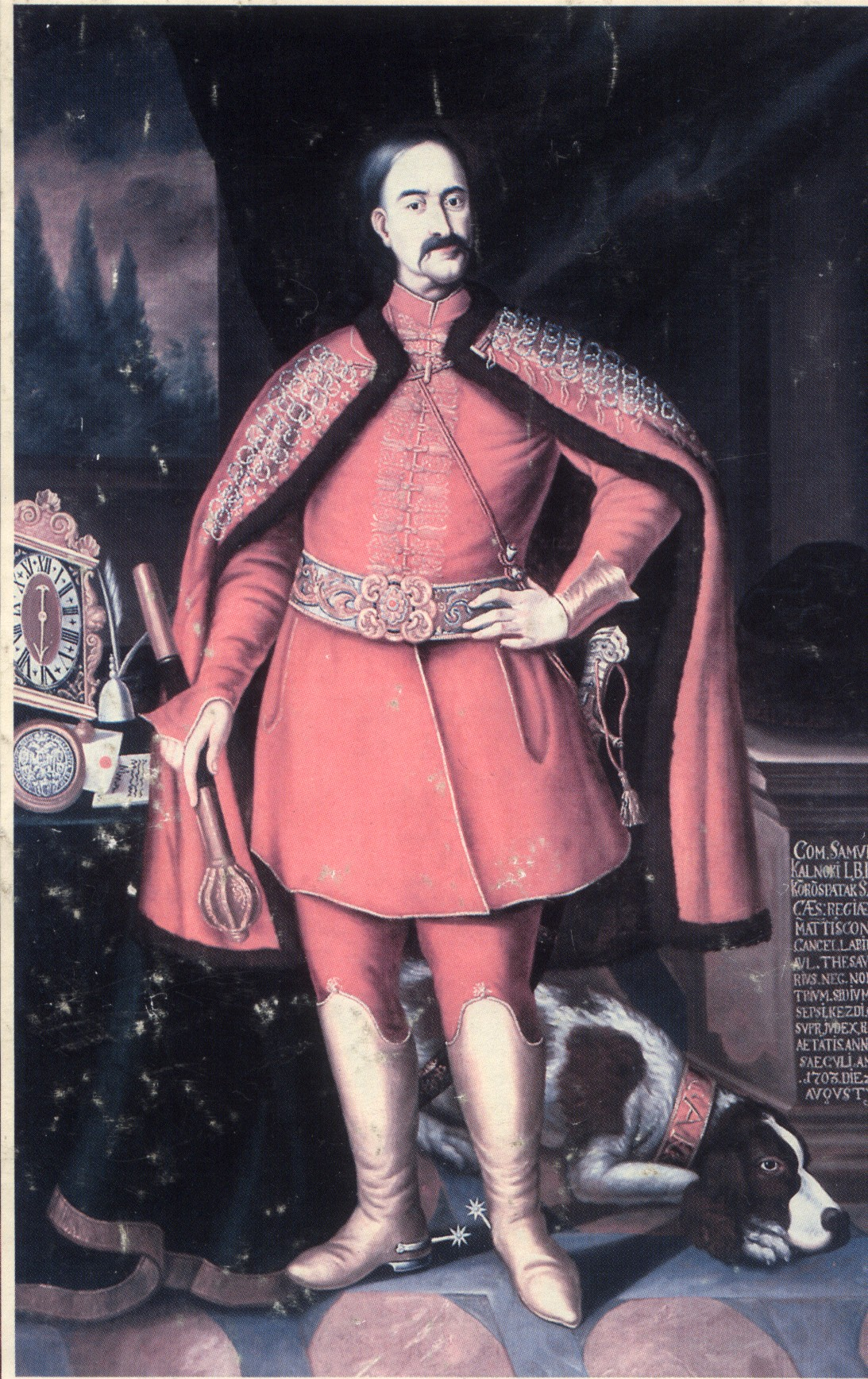
- Born: 1640
- Died: 6 October 1706 (aged 65–66); Vienna
- Children: Antal

Sámuel Kálnoky (1640–1706) was a member of the Kálnoky family who served as the chancellor of Transylvania.

Kálnoky became the first chancellor of Transylvania in Vienna and received the rank of count by the Habsburgs (1697 full title: count Kálnoky baron of Kőröspatak).

== Bibliography ==
- Révai Nagy Lexikona
