= Číčov =

Číčov Csicsó
- Municipality
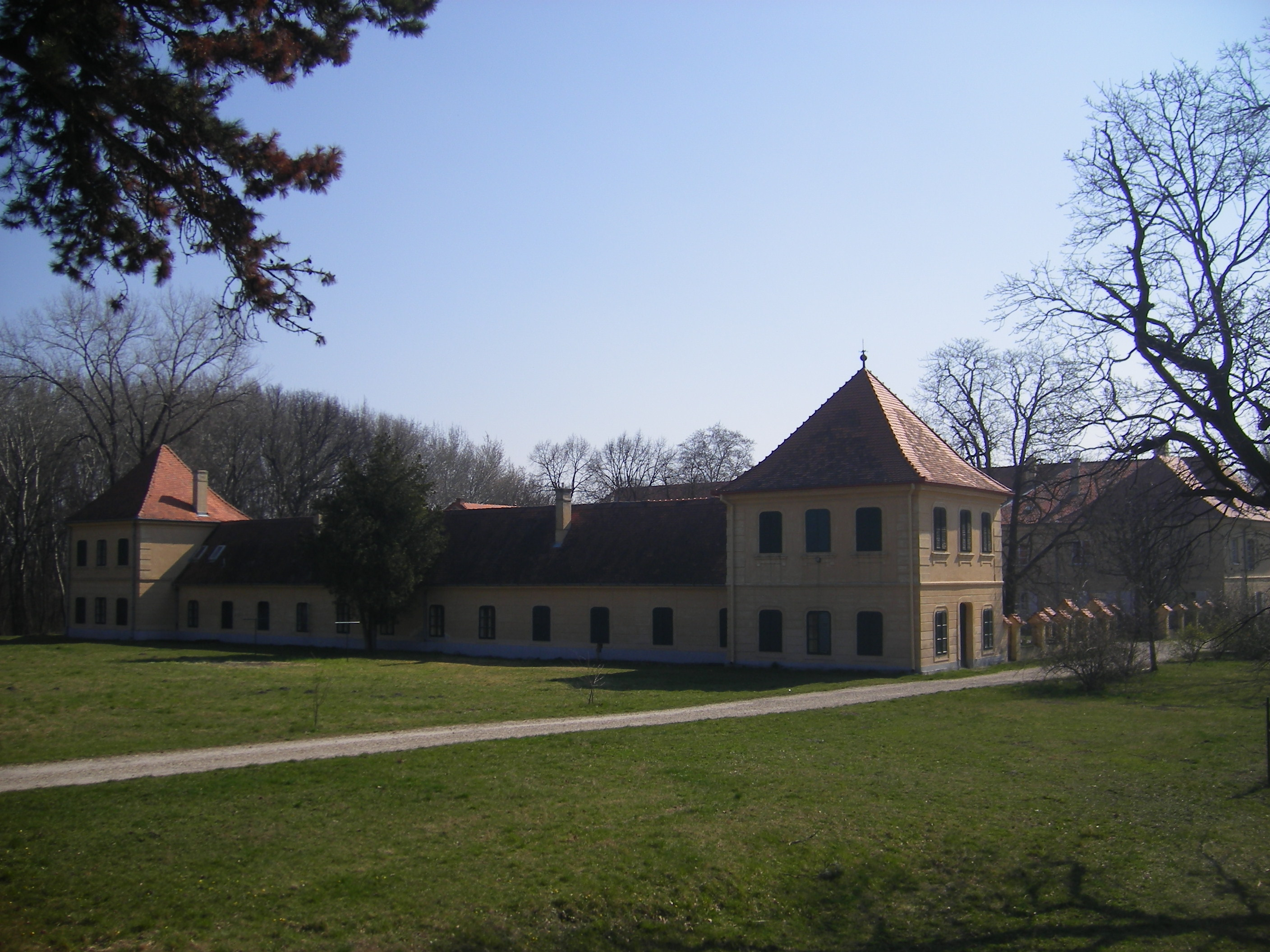
- Kálnoky family castle

- Flag Coat of arms

- Location of Číčov in the Nitra Region Location of Číčov in Slovakia
- Coordinates: 47.77°N 17.77°E
- Country: Slovakia
- Region: Nitra Region
- District: Komárno District
- First mentioned: 1172

Government
  - Mayor: Csaba Földes (SMK-MKP)

Area
  - Total: 29.50 km^{2} (11.39 sq mi)
- Elevation: 110 m (360 ft)

Population (2025)
  - Total: 1,188
- Time zone: UTC+1 (CET)
  - Summer (DST): UTC+2 (CEST)
- Postal code: 946 19
- Area code: +421 35
- Vehicle registration plate (until 2022): KN
- Website: www.cicov.sk

Číčov (Hungarian: Csicsó, pronounced [ˈtʃitʃoː]) is a village and municipality in the Komárno District in the Nitra Region of south-west Slovakia.

== Geography ==
The municipality lies at an altitude of 110 metres (360 ft) and covers an area of 29.50 km^{2} (11.39 sq mi) (2025).

== History ==
In the 9th century, the territory of Číčov became part of the Kingdom of Hungary. The village was first mentioned in 1172 as Chichou. In 1268 belonged to Komárom fortress, later it was the property of the Counts Pálffy, Zichy and Kálnoky. In 1682, as a result of the Counter-Reformation the local Calvinist church was banned. In the early 18th century the residents of the village supported the Francis II Rákóczi's uprising. The Treaty of Trianon assigned Číčov to Czechoslovakia, in spite of the village's Hungarian majority. In 1938 following the First Vienna Arbitration it was reannexed by Hungary, but lost again after the end of World War II.

== Population ==
Population statistic (10 years)
Year	1995	2005	2015	2025
Count	1349	1355	1268	1188
Difference		+0.44%	−6.42%	−6.30%

Population statistic
Year	2024	2025
Count	1186	1188
Difference		+0.16%

It has a population of 1188 people (31 December 2025).

=== Ethnicity ===
Census 2021 (1+ %)
Ethnicity	Number	Fraction
Hungarian	995	80.82%
Not found out	150	12.18%
Slovak	142	11.53%
Total	1231	

In year 2021 was 1231 people by ethnicity 995 as Hungarian, 150 as Not found out, 142 as Slovak, 10 as Ukrainian, 5 as Czech, 2 as Other, 1 as Jewish and 1 as Bulgarian.

Note on population: The difference values of population numbers in the table "Population statistic" and in the sections "Ethnicity" & "Religion" is caused by the use of various statistical methods.

=== Religion ===
Census 2021 (1+ %)
Religion	Number	Fraction
Roman Catholic Church	379	30.79%
Calvinist Church	354	28.76%
None	329	26.73%
Not found out	122	9.91%
Evangelical Church	21	1.71%
Total	1231	

In year 2021 was 1231 people by religion 379 from Roman Catholic Church, 354 from Calvinist Church, 329 from None, 122 from Not found out, 21 from Evangelical Church, 8 from Greek Catholic Church, 4 from Islam, 3 from Christian Congregations in Slovakia, 2 from Eastern Orthodox Church, 2 from Paganism and natural spirituality, 2 from Other and not ascertained christian church, 1 from Old Catholic Church, 1 from United Methodist Church, 1 from Czechoslovak Hussite Church, 1 from Buddhism and 1 from Ad hoc movements.

== Facilities ==
The village has a public library a gym and a football pitch.

== Genealogical resources ==
The records for genealogical research are available at the state archive "Statny Archiv in Bratislava, Nitra, Slovakia"

- Roman Catholic church records (births/marriages/deaths): 1724-1910 (parish A)
- Reformated church records (births/marriages/deaths): 1784-1933 (parish A)

== See also ==
- List of municipalities and towns in Slovakia
