= Count Gustav Kálnoky =

Austro-Hungarian diplomat and statesman

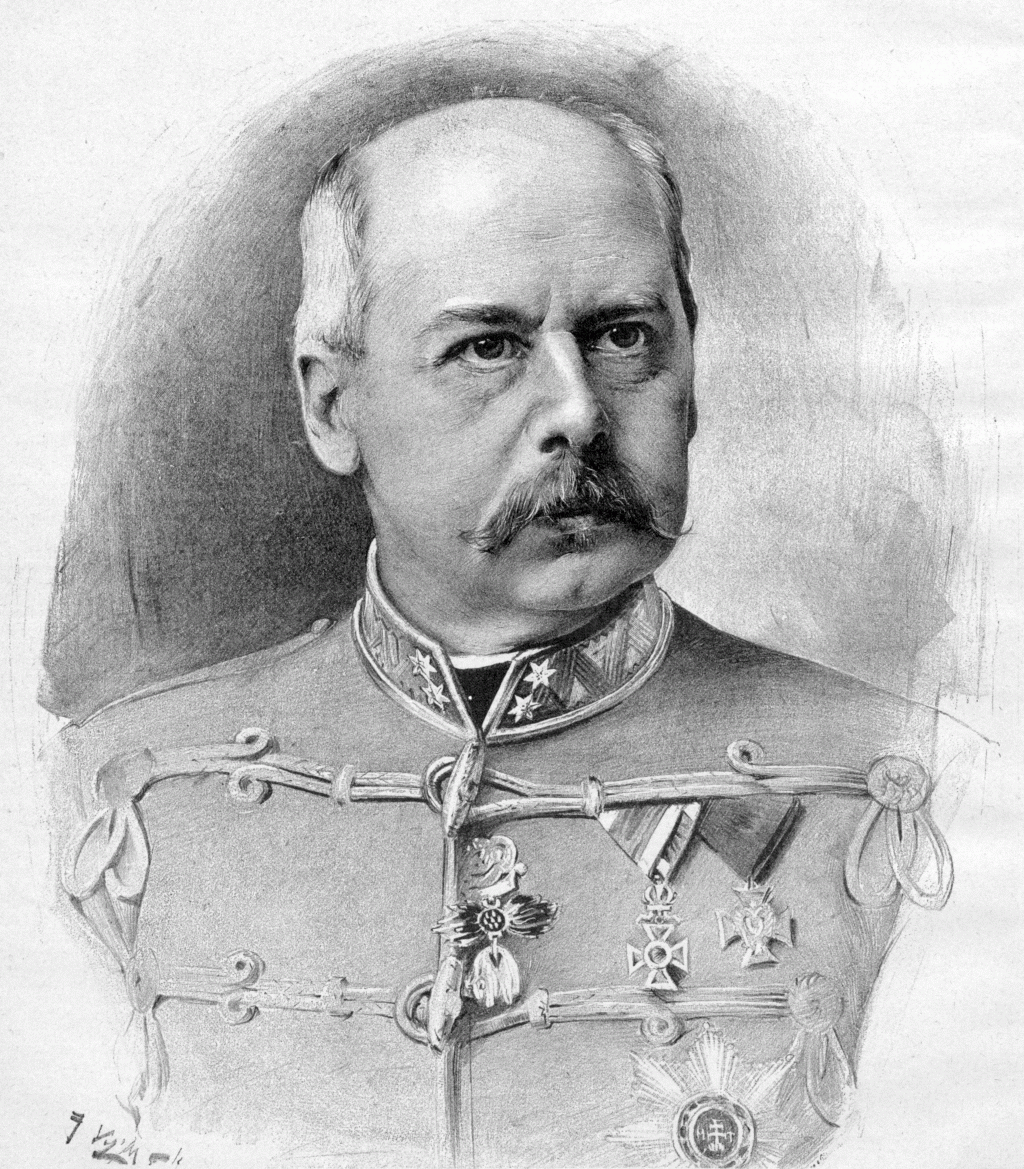
Count Gustav Kálnoky by Jan Vilímek

Count Gustav Siegmund Kálnoky von Kőröspatak (Hungarian: gróf Kálnoky Gusztáv Zsigmond) (December 29, 1832 – February 13, 1898) was an Austro-Hungarian diplomat and statesman.

== Biography ==
Kálnoky was born in Letovice (Lettowitz), Moravia to an old Transylvanian family which had held comital rank in Hungary from the 17th century. After spending some years in a hussar regiment, in 1854 he entered the diplomatic service without giving up his connection with the army in which he reached the rank of general in 1879. He was for the ten years (1860–1870) secretary of embassy at London and then, after serving at Rome and Copenhagen, was in 1880 appointed ambassador at St. Petersburg. His success in Russia procured for him, on the death of Baron Heinrich Karl von Haymerle in 1881, the appointment of minister of foreign affairs for Austria-Hungary, a post which he held for fourteen years.

Essentially a diplomatist, he took little or no part in the vexed internal affairs of the Dual Monarchy, and he came little before the public except at the annual statement on foreign affairs before the Delegations. His management of the affairs of his department was, however, very successful; he confirmed and maintained the alliance with Germany, which had been formed by his predecessors, and co-operated with Bismarck in the arrangements by which Italy joined the alliance. Kálnoky's special influence was seen in the improvement of Austrian relations with Russia, following on the meeting of the three emperors in September 1884 at Skierniewice, at which he was present. His Russophile policy caused some adverse criticism in Hungary. His friendliness for Russia did not, however, prevent him from strengthening the position of Austria as against Russia in the Balkan Peninsula by the establishment later of a closer political and commercial understanding with Serbia and Romania. In 1885 he interfered after the battle of Slivnitsa to arrest the advance of the Bulgarians on Belgrade, but he lost influence in Serbia after the abdication of King Milan.

Though he kept aloof from the Clericalal party, Kálnoky was a strong Catholic; and his sympathy for the difficulties of the Church caused adverse comment in Italy, when, in 1891, he stated in a speech before the Delegations that the question of the position of the Pope was still unsettled. He subsequently explained that by this he did not refer to the Roman question, which was permanently settled, but to the possibility of the Pope leaving Rome. The jealousy felt in Hungary against the Ultramontanes led to his fall. In 1895 a case of clerical interference in the internal affairs of Hungary by the nuncio Antonio Agliardi aroused a strong protest in the Hungarian parliament, and consequent differences between Dezső Bánffy, the Hungarian minister, and the minister for foreign affairs led to Kálnoky's resignation. He died in Brodek u Prostějova (Prödlitz).

He was awarded the Serbian Order of the Cross of Takovo.

== Orders and decorations ==
- (Austrian Empire) (Kingdom of Hungary) Austria-Hungary:
  - Knight of the Imperial Order of Leopold, 1868
  - Grand Cross of the Royal Hungarian Order of St. Stephen, 1883
  - Knight of the Golden Fleece, 1887
- Kingdom of Bavaria: Knight of St. Hubert
- Belgium: Grand Cordon of the Order of Leopold
- Empire of Brazil: Grand Cross of the Imperial Order of Our Lord Jesus Christ
- Denmark:
  - Grand Cross of the Dannebrog, 8 January 1880
  - Knight of the Elephant, 18 May 1889
- Holy See: Grand Cross of St. Gregory the Great
- Sovereign Military Order of Malta: Bailiff Grand Cross of Honour and Devotion
- Monaco: Grand Cross of St. Charles, 11 April 1882
- Kingdom of Portugal: Grand Cross of the Tower and Sword
- Kingdom of Prussia: Knight of the Black Eagle, 25 July 1883
- Kingdom of Serbia:
  - Grand Cross of the White Eagle
  - Grand Cross of the Cross of Takovo
- Spain: Grand Cross of the Order of Charles III, with Collar
- Sweden-Norway: Knight of the Seraphim, 20 April 1885

== See also ==
- Triple Alliance
- Kálnoky family
- Valea Crişului

Preceded by Baron Haymerle	Minister of Foreign Affairs; 1881–1895	Succeeded by Count Goluchowski
