= Číčov Manor =

Historic site in Nitra Region, Slovakia

- Číčov, Nitra Region, Slovakia
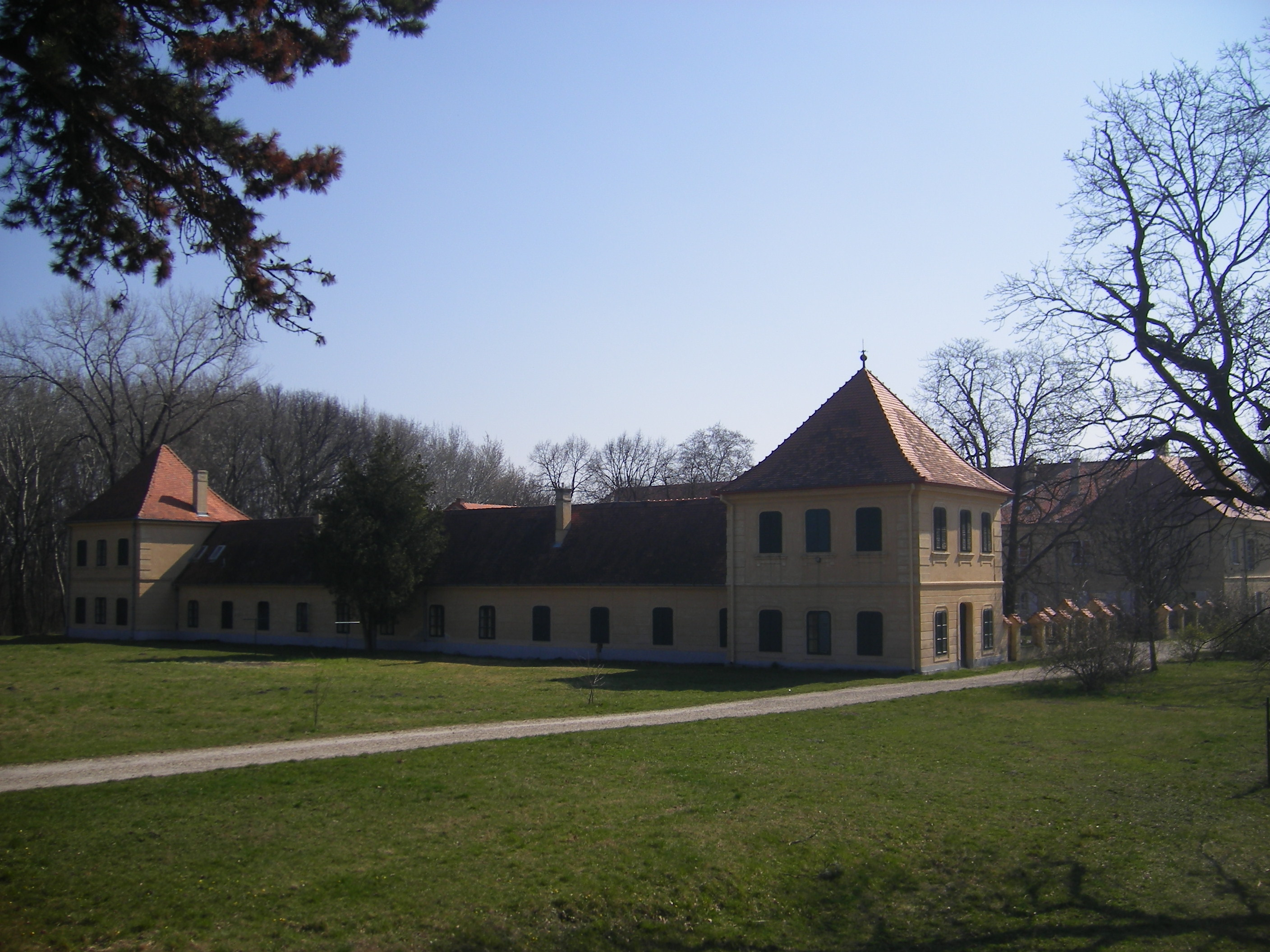

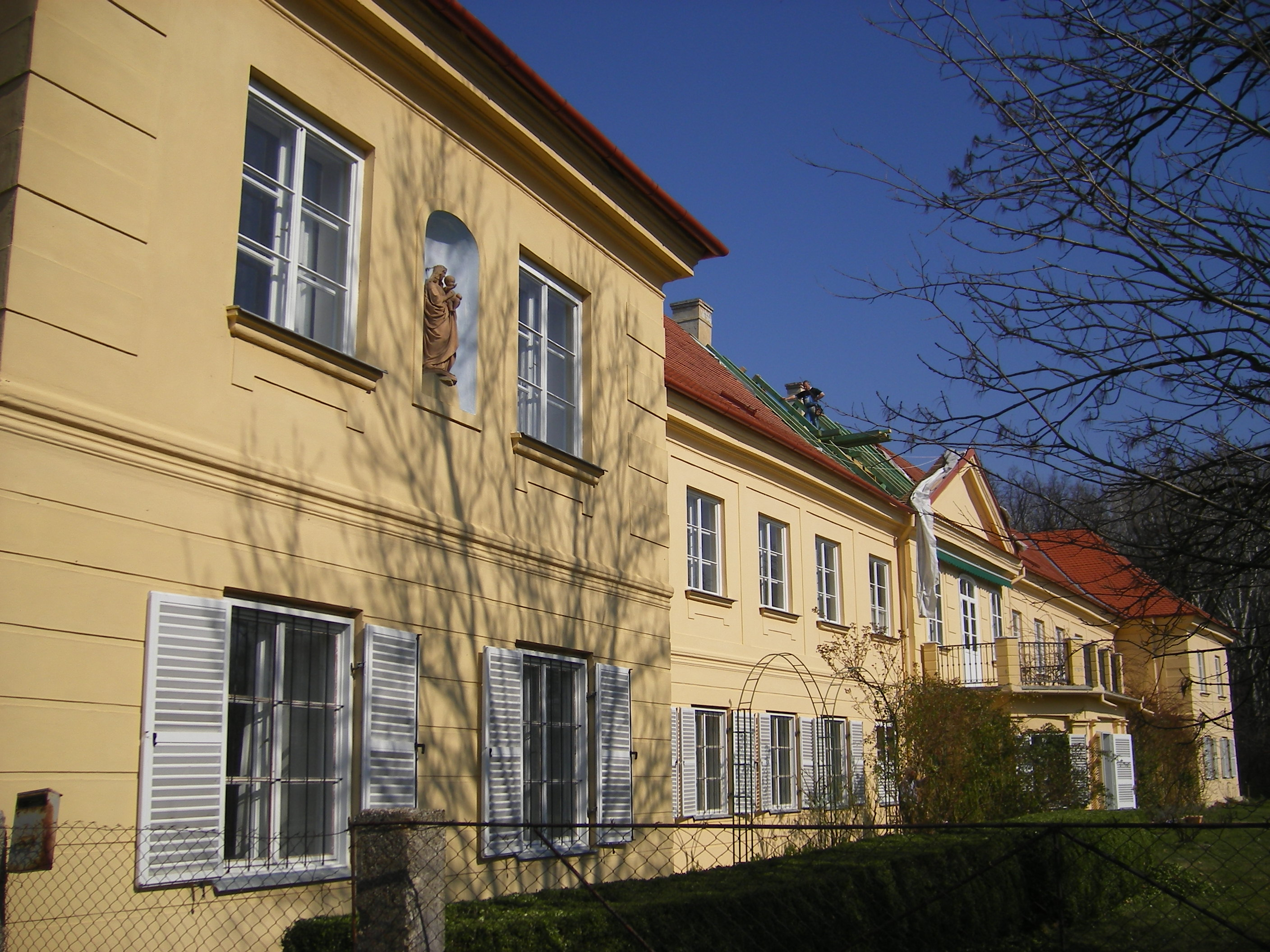

Location
- Coordinates: 47.77299°N 17.76864°E

Číčov Manor (Slovak: Číčov Kaštiel), also referred to as the Kálnoky-Liechtenstein manor house, is a manor house located in Číčov in the Nitra Region of Slovakia.

== History ==
The Renaissance manor house in Číčov was likely begun to be built around 1630, possibly during Paul Zichy's time, but most sources say it was built between 1657 and 1660 after Count Stephen Zichy received imperial permission. Originally a fortified complex with a courtyard, towers, and defensive walls, it was damaged in the 18th century by floods and fire, leading to major rebuilds in 1776 in Baroque and Classicist styles. The fortress features were removed over time, and the manor became a principal Zichy residence. In the 19th century, it was remodeled into a two-storey, three-wing residence, losing its fortifications. Ownership passed through the Zichy family and later to Count Johann Nepomuk von Waldstein-Wartenberg, who hosted Emperor Franz Joseph I. After his death, the manor was cared for by his widow and her second husband, both of whom died there.

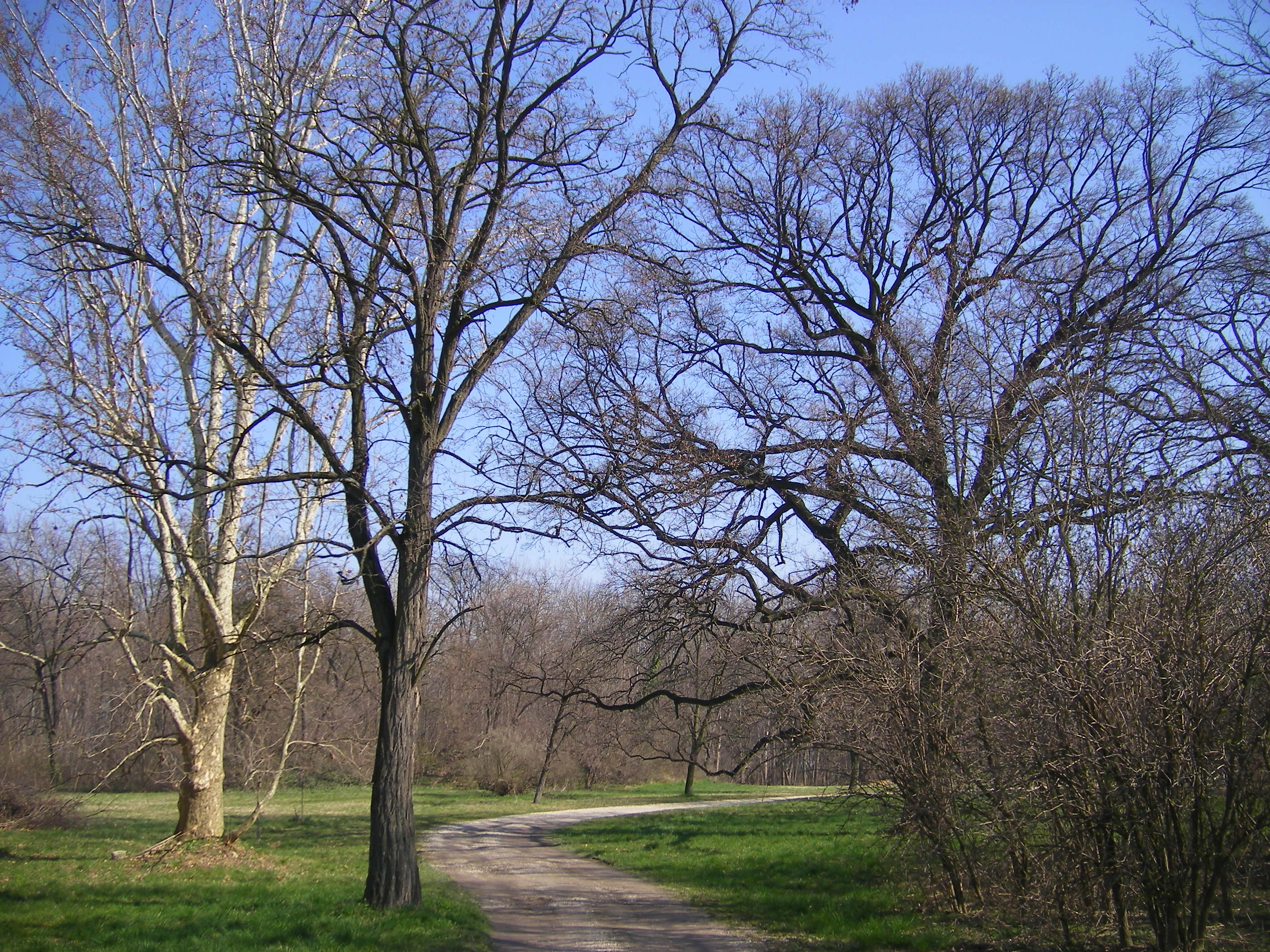
The manor gardens

After 1905, the manor house belonged to Alexander Kálnoky and remained in the family until 1945, when it was nationalized. The family was forced to leave the property and the country by 1948, and the manor lost its residential function. In the post-war years, Slovak families occupied the building, and it was adapted for school use until 1983, which, along with neglect and a devastating flood in 1965, led to significant deterioration. In the early 1990s, the manor was restituted to the Kálnoky family, who gradually restored it.

== Architecture ==
The manor house in Číčov was originally built as a fortified Renaissance residence in the late 17th century, featuring a square layout with an inner courtyard, four corner towers, and a moat. Its center housed a separate inner palace with a loggia and a multi-storey stair tower, and a polygonal onion-domed tower was in the southeastern corner. After damage from a flood and fire in 1764, it was extensively rebuilt in 1776 into a Baroque-Classicist two-storey, three-wing residence with an honorary courtyard, and its defensive features were removed. The current appearance mainly results from early 19th-century Classicist remodeling, later refaced in the mid-19th century, characterized by a prominent façade with central and lateral risalits, rusticated ground floor, and detailed window surrounds, with rooms featuring flat ceilings and a vaulted staircase.
