= Kálnoky family =

Hungarian noble family

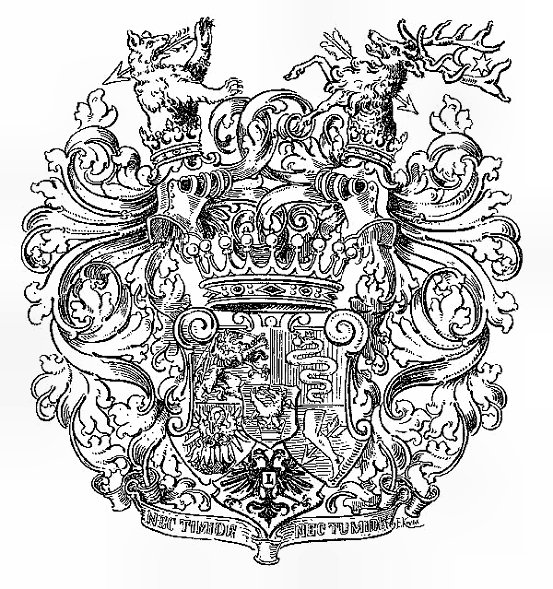
Coat of arms of the Counts Kálnoky

The House of Kálnoky is a noble family originating from the Kingdom of Hungary. The Kálnoky family history can be traced back to medieval times.

== History ==
In 1252 the family was documented in Székely Land, in the eastern part of Transylvania, as comes (chief) of the Szekler 'Sepsi' tribe.

Since their first documentation, the family have been primores (magnates) of the Szekler people in Transylvania.

They are styled as Count Kálnoky Baron of Kőröspatak since 1697 when Sámuel Kálnoky (1640–1706) was chancellor of Transylvania at the court of Vienna.

At the beginning of the 18th century, through multiple marriages, the Kálnokys became close to Prince Constantin Brancoveanu, ruler of Wallachia. An entire generation grew up in Bucharest at the prince's court, and held public functions there.

To support Austria's Empress Maria Theresia in the Erbfolgekrieg War of the Austrian Succession, the family established a regiment of hussars in 1741 which bore their name. The daughter of the Austrian empire's first chancellor married into the Kálnoky family, who thus inherited some of the chancellor's possessions in Moravia.

Two hundred years of military and political careers followed for the family in Austria. The Kálnokys had a hereditary seat in the House of Lords in Vienna. Under Emperor Franz Joseph I, Count Gustav Kálnoky presided over the joint (Austrian and Hungarian) council of ministers and was minister of the Imperial House and of Foreign Affairs. Effectively, he was the emperor's right hand between 1881 and 1895. He signed the Triple Alliance (1882) between the Austro-Hungarian empire, Germany and Italy. He extended this in 1883 by signing a secret treaty with Romania for reciprocal military support.

Besides their outstanding military and political careers, the Kálnokys have been known for their advantageous wedding strategies. Several members married heiresses of aristocratic families on the verge of extinction, thus considerably increasing the Kálnokys' assets and influence in central and western Europe. Count Hugo Kálnoky married Countess Marie Mensdorff-Pouilly-Dietrichstein, a niece of British Queen Victoria's consort, Prince Albert. Countesses Kálnoky also married into the Houses of Habsburg, Hohenzollern, Liechtenstein and others.

== Family-related books and movies ==
- Ingeborg Countess Kálnoky's The Guest House – The Witnesses at Nuremberg (Bobbs-Merrill, 1974), co-written with Ilona Herisko, is a memoir of her time between September 1945 and January 1947 as the hostess of the houses set up by the Americans for the witnesses who were to appear before the International Military Tribunal at Nuremberg. People housed under her supervision included everyone from Hitler's personal photographer Heinrich Hoffmann and Gestapo founder Rudolf Diels to members of the German resistance and concentration camp survivors.
- Christiane Kohl's Das Zeugenhaus (Goldmann, 2005), mines similar territory as Ingeborg Kálnoky's The Guest House but is based on both Kalnoky's guest book and personal recollections as well as the recollections of Bernhard von Kleist, who worked as an interpreter for the Americans at the Nuremberg trials, and the guest book entries of his wife, Annemarie von Kleist, who took over the witness house after Countess Kálnoky. An English-language version was published in 2010, titled The Witness House: Nazis and Holocaust Survivors Sharing a Villa During the Nuremberg Trials (Other Press).
- Boris Kálnoky's German-language Ahnenland – oder die Suche nach der Seele meiner Familie (Droemer Knaur, 2011), originally intended as a biography about his staunchly anti-communist and anti-fascist grandfather, Hugó Kálnoky, who worked as a journalist, chronicles the storied Kálnoky family history based on old records, personal letters, diaries and newspaper articles from its beginnings in 13th-century Transylvania all the way up to modern times.
- A movie of the same name, based on Christiane Kohl's Das Zeugenhaus (The Witness House in English), appeared on Germany's ZDF television on 24 November 2014. It was directed by Matti Geschonneck and produced by Oliver Berben, with his mother/actress, Iris Berben, cast as Ingeborg Countess Kálnoky.
- Nathalie Kálnoky: ‘The Szekler Nation and Medieval Hungary: Politics, Law and Identity on the Frontier’. Bloomsbury, 2020

== Descendants ==
Male descendants live today in Austria, Portugal, Australia, Hungary and Romania.

- Gustav Kálnoky (Hungarian: gróf Kőröspataki Kálnoky Gusztáv Zsigmond, means "from Sepsikőröspatak" (Romanian: Valea Crișului, now Covasna County)), an Austro-Hungarian statesman (1832–1898)
- Sámuel Kálnoky, chancellor of Transylvania (1640–1706)
- Antal Kálnoky, general of the Kálnoky hussar regiment Nr 2 (1707–1783)
- Dénes Kálnoky, a Transylvanian politician, writer and freedom fighter (1814–1888)
- Boris Kálnoky, a German-Hungarian journalist and writer (1961–)
- Tibor Kálnoky, a conservationist in Romania (1966–), president of The Kálnoky Foundation and host of His Majesty King Charles III at his yearly visits to Transylvania
- Lindi Kálnoky, an Austrian politician (1935–)

== See also ==
- Lindi Kálnoky, on German Wikipedia
- List of wedding guests of Prince William and Catherine Middleton, Tibor Kálnoky at Prince William's wedding
- List of titled noble families in the Kingdom of Hungary
