= Valea Crișului =

Valea Crișului Sepsikőröspatak
- Commune
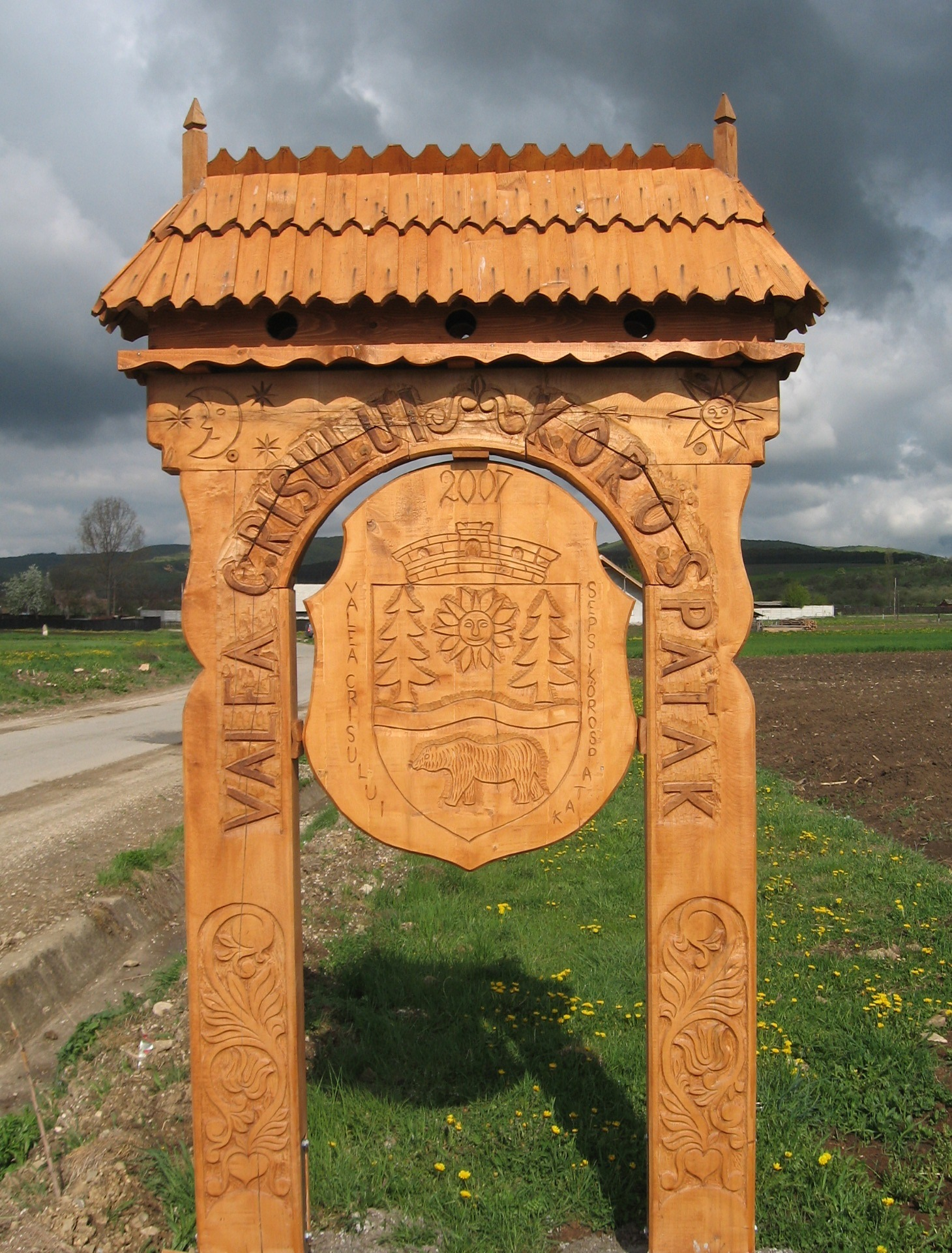
- Entrance to Valea Crișului

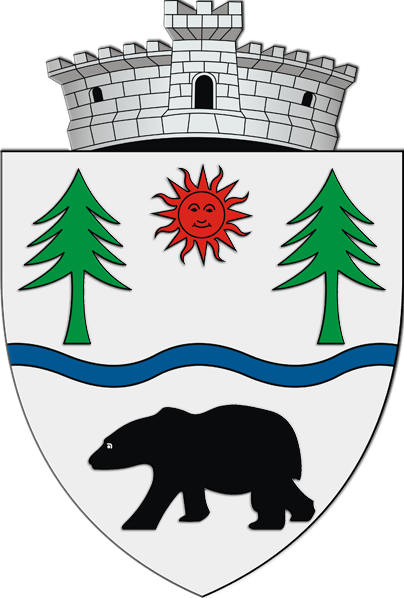
- Coat of arms

- Location in Covasna County

- Location in Romania
- Coordinates: 45°55′N 25°46′E
- Country: Romania
- County: Covasna

Government
  - Mayor (2020–2024): Sándor Kisgyőrgy (UDMR)
- Area: 27.85 km^{2} (10.75 sq mi)
- Elevation: 606 m (1,988 ft)
- Population (2021-12-01): 2,354
  - Density: 84.52/km^{2} (218.9/sq mi)
- Time zone: UTC+02:00 (EET)
  - Summer (DST): UTC+03:00 (EEST)
- Postal code: 527165
- Area code: (+40) 02 67
- Vehicle reg.: CV
- Website: www.primariavaleacrisului.ro

Valea Crișului (Hungarian: Sepsikőröspatak [ˈʃɛpʃikørøʃpɒtɒk]) is a commune in Covasna County, Transylvania, Romania composed of two villages: Calnic (Kálnok) and Valea Crișului. In 2004, the village of Arcuș split away from Valea Crișului to form an independent commune.

== History ==
The settlement formed part of the Székely Land region of the historical Transylvania province. Until 1918, the village belonged to the Háromszék County of the Kingdom of Hungary. In the immediate aftermath of World War I, following the declaration of the Union of Transylvania with Romania, the area passed under Romanian administration during the Hungarian–Romanian War of 1918–1919. By the terms of the Treaty of Trianon of 1920, it became part of the Kingdom of Romania.

In 1925, the commune fell within Plasa Sfântu Gheorghe of Trei Scaune County. In August 1940, under the auspices of Nazi Germany, which imposed the Second Vienna Award, Hungary retook the territory of Northern Transylvania (which included Valea Crișului) from Romania. Towards the end of World War II, however, the commune was taken back from Hungarian and German troops by Romanian and Soviet forces in September 1944.

In 1950, after Communist Romania was established, Valea Crișului became part of the Sfântu Gheorghe Raion of Stalin Region. From 1952 and 1960, it was part of the Magyar Autonomous Region, and between 1960 and 1968 it reverted to Brașov Region. In 1968, when Romania was reorganized based on counties rather than regions, the commune became part of Covasna County.

== Demographics ==
Historical population
Year	Pop.	±%
1850	1,538	—
1930	1,952	+26.9%
1977	2,184	+11.9%
2002	2,175	−0.4%
2011	2,307	+6.1%
2021	2,354	+2.0%
Source: Census data

The commune has an absolute Székely Hungarian majority. According to the 2002 census, it had a population of 2,175, of which 98.44% were Hungarians. At the 2011 census, it had 2,307 inhabitants, of which 92.59% were Hungarians and 1.04% Romanians. At the 2021 census, Valea Crișului had a population of 2,354, of which 91.67% were Hungarians and 1.32% Romanians.

== Points of interest ==
- There is a historic Roman Catholic church at Valea Crișului. In its semicircular apse dating from the era of the Arpad dynasty, there are fragments of medieval frescoes considered to be of the 14th century. Its smaller bell was made in Brașov in 1512. The patronal feast of the church is on Trinity Sunday.
- The ancestral castle of the family of Count Kálnoky. The ancient Renaissance castle, built at the cusp of the 17th century, has been renovated several times.
- There are man-made caves in the rocky slopes of the Fenyős Peak, which in winter serve as a refuge for insects and moths. The longest among them is the Ploti Cave (14 m).

== People ==
- Kőröspataki Kálnoky family

== Calnic ==
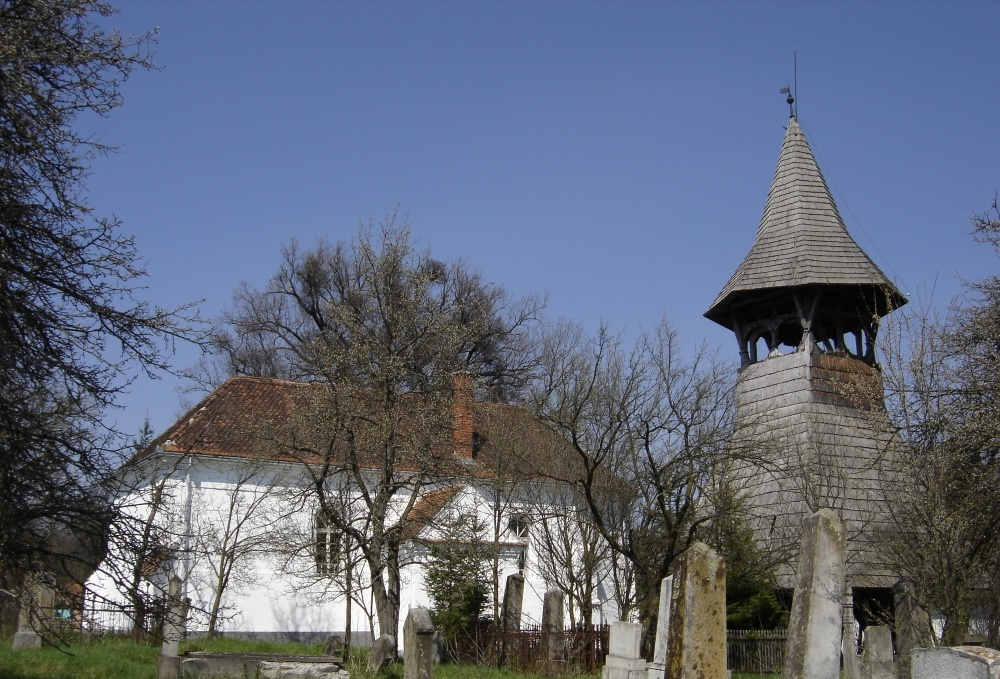
The 18th-century bell tower at Calnic

The neighboring village of Calnic (3 km) belongs administratively to Valea Crișului.

The masterpiece of wood carving is the 18th-century bell tower at Calnic, covered by two wooden. The Unitarian church next to it dates from 1781. Not a single iron nail was used in its construction. Both structures are listed monuments.

The Unitarian church at Calnic, dating to 1674, is a historic monument. Its floral-patterned coffered ceiling dates from the same century. Its two carved portals are the work of folk artists Dénes Nemes and András Bálint.

== Gallery ==
Valea Crișului

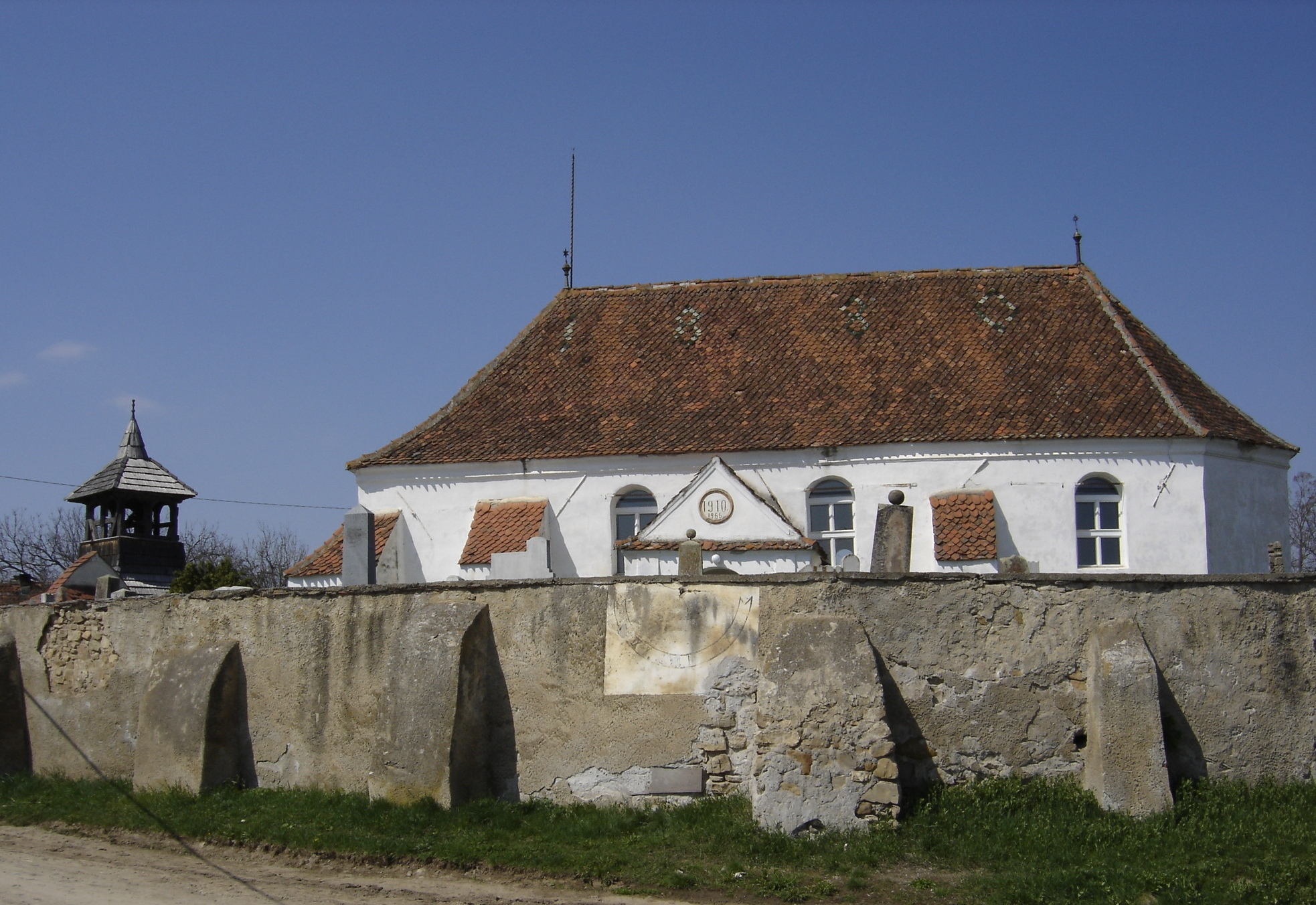
Fortified church of Calnic

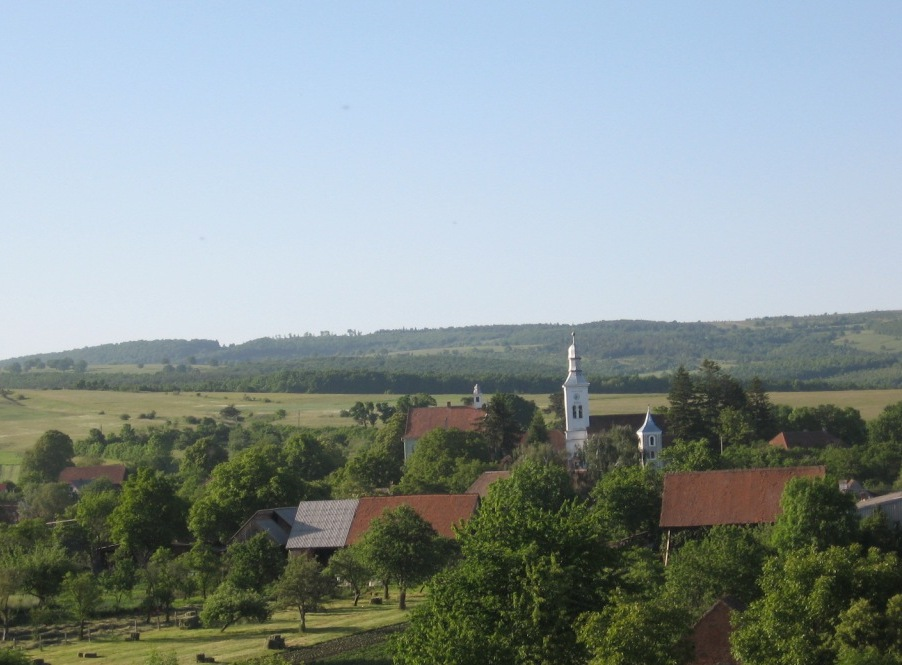
Panorama

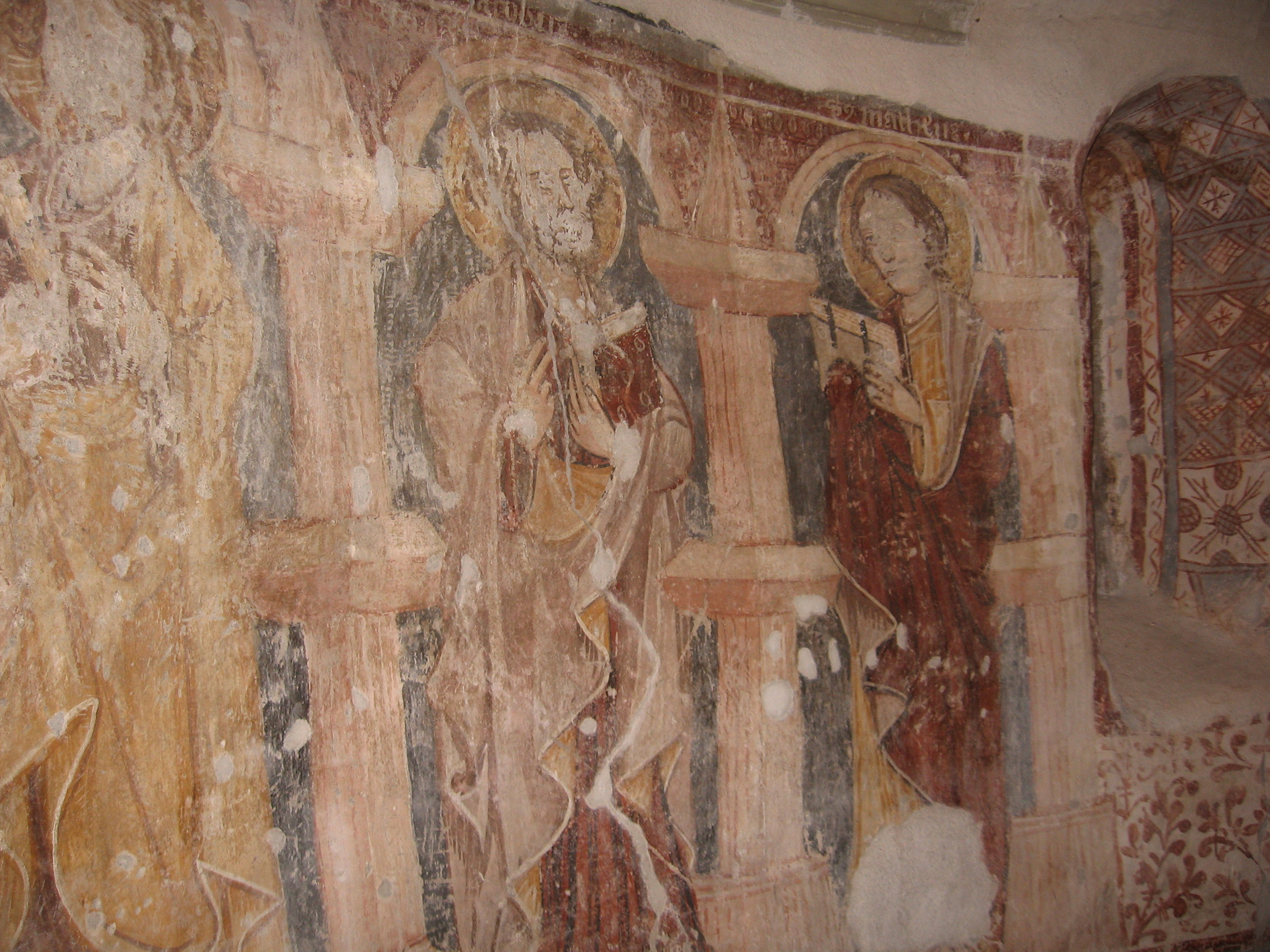
Roman Catholic church, Mural

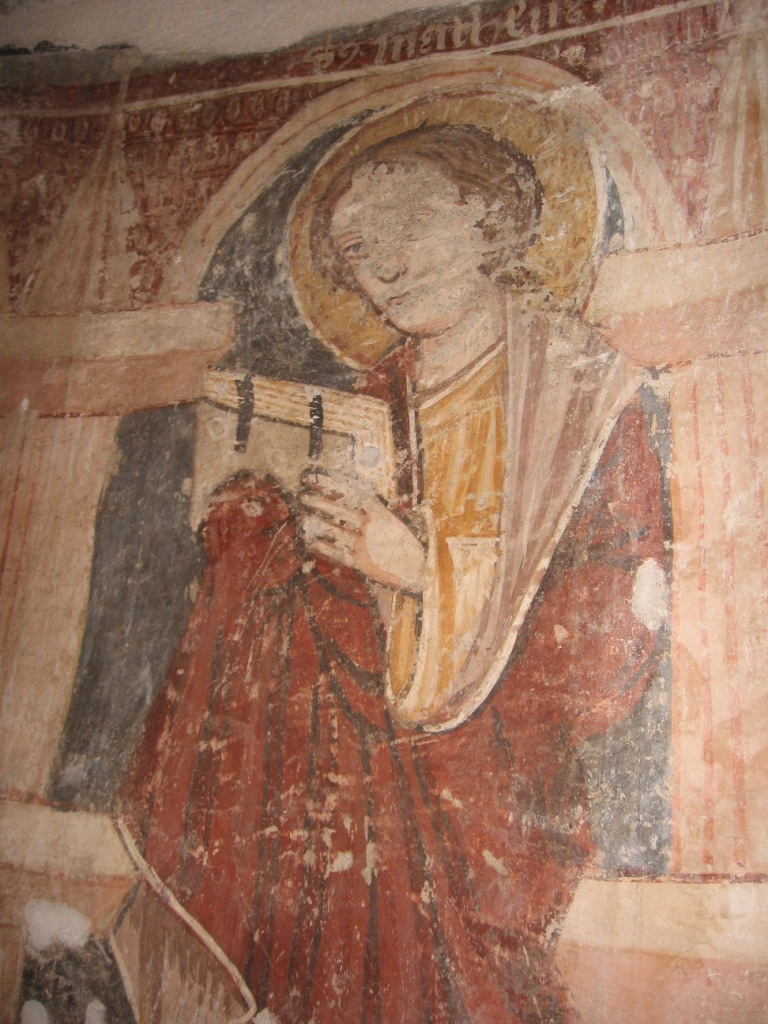
Apostle Matthew

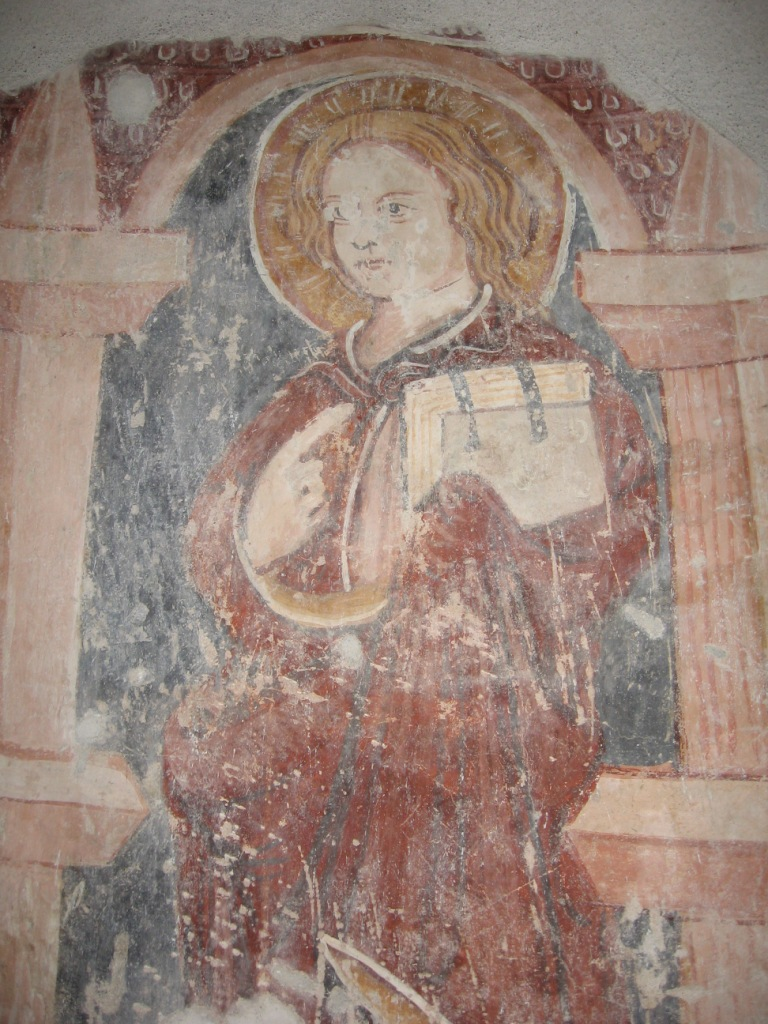

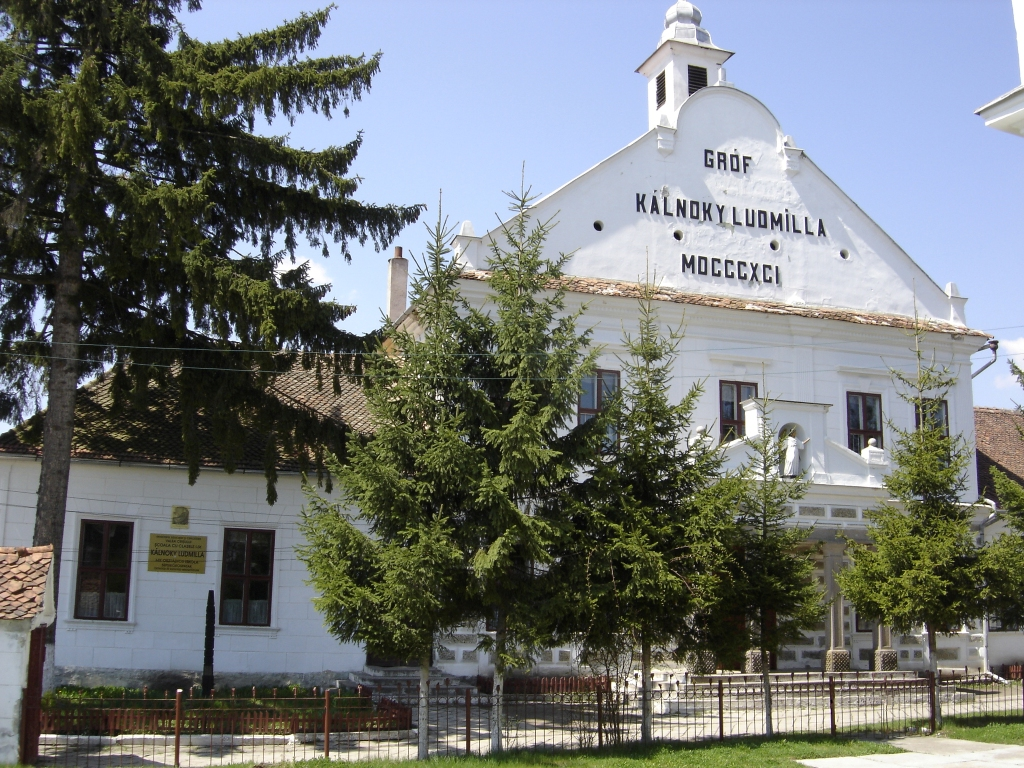
Kálnoky Ludmilla school

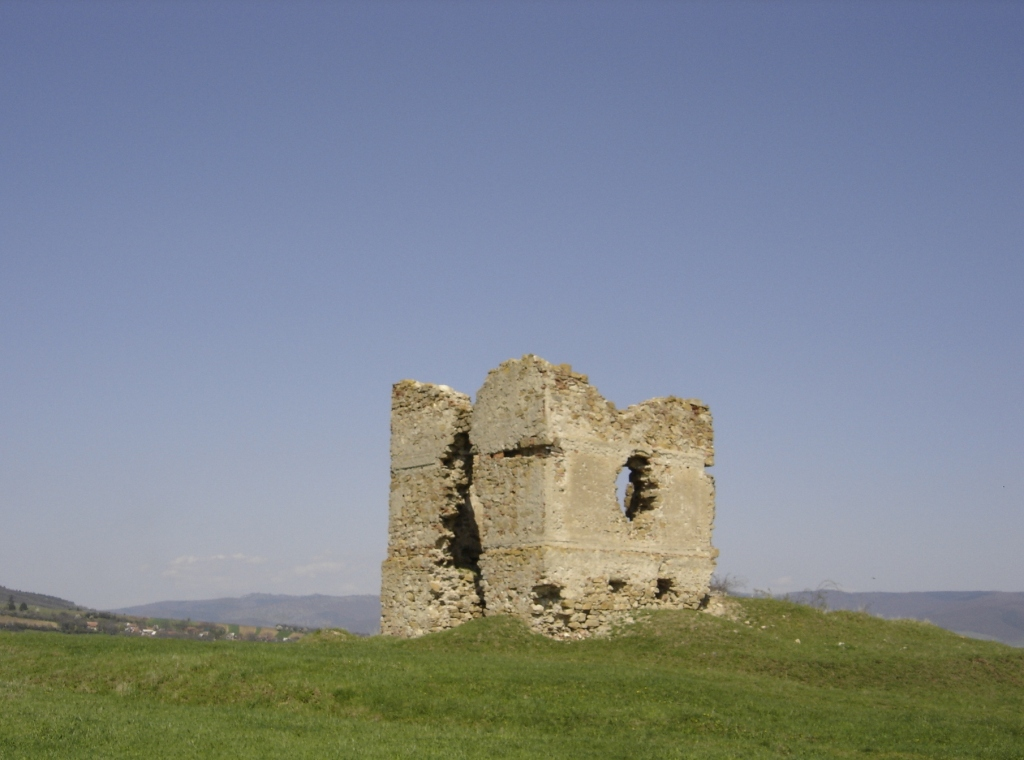
Chapel ruin

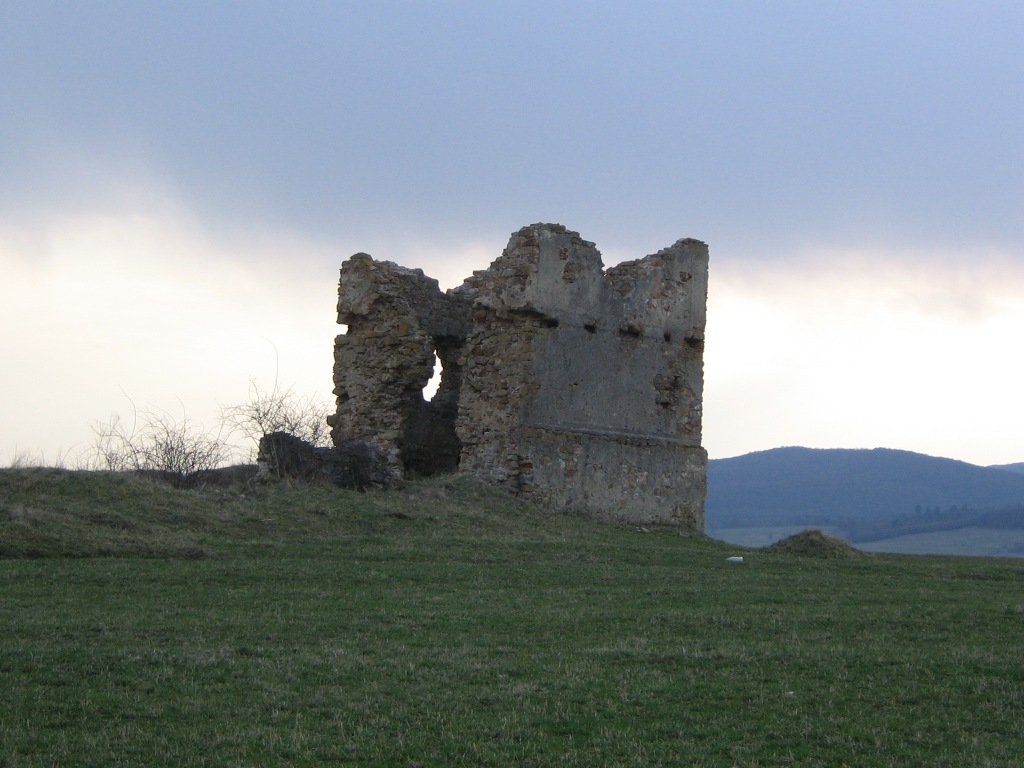
Chapel ruin

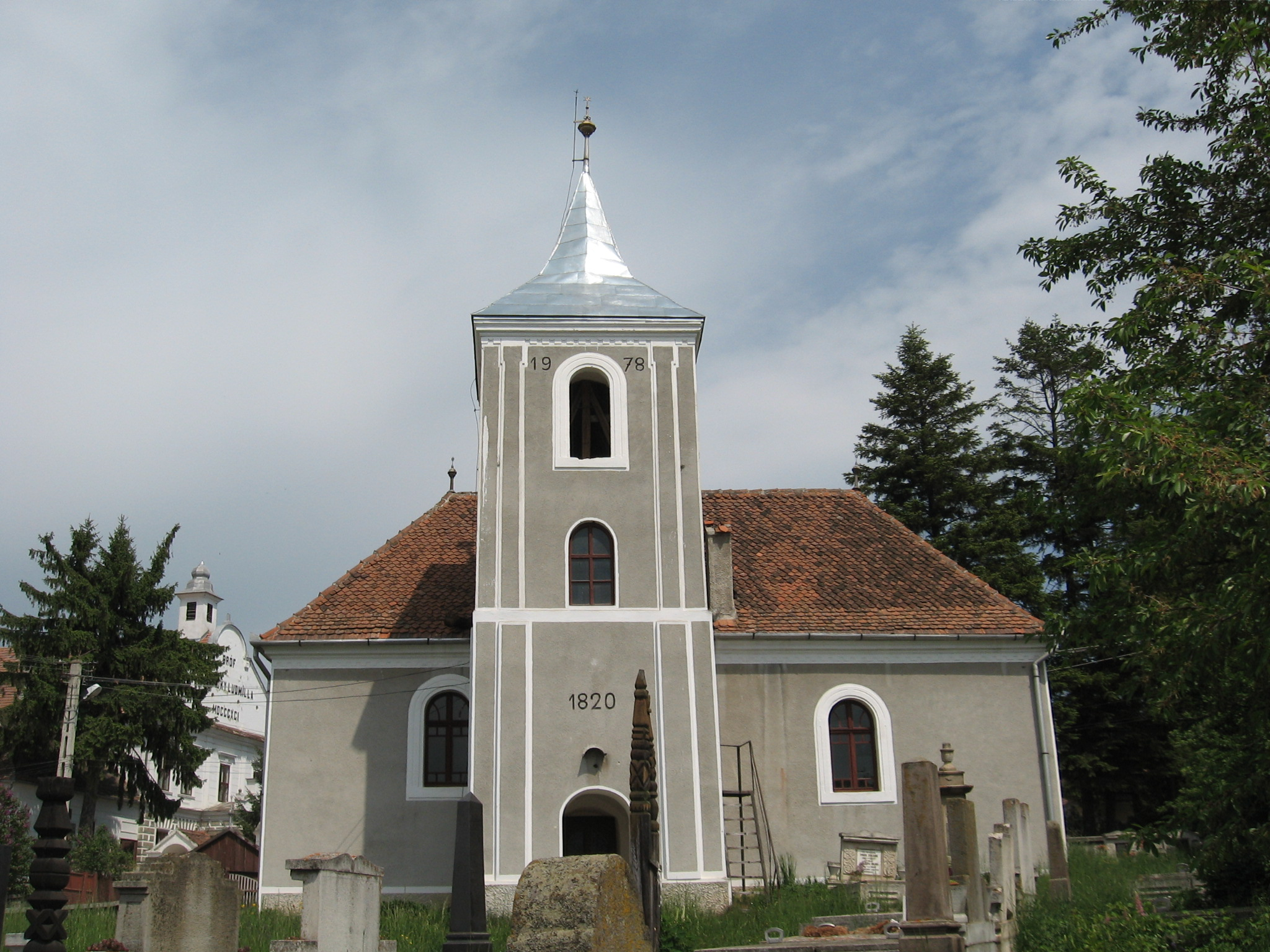
Reformed church

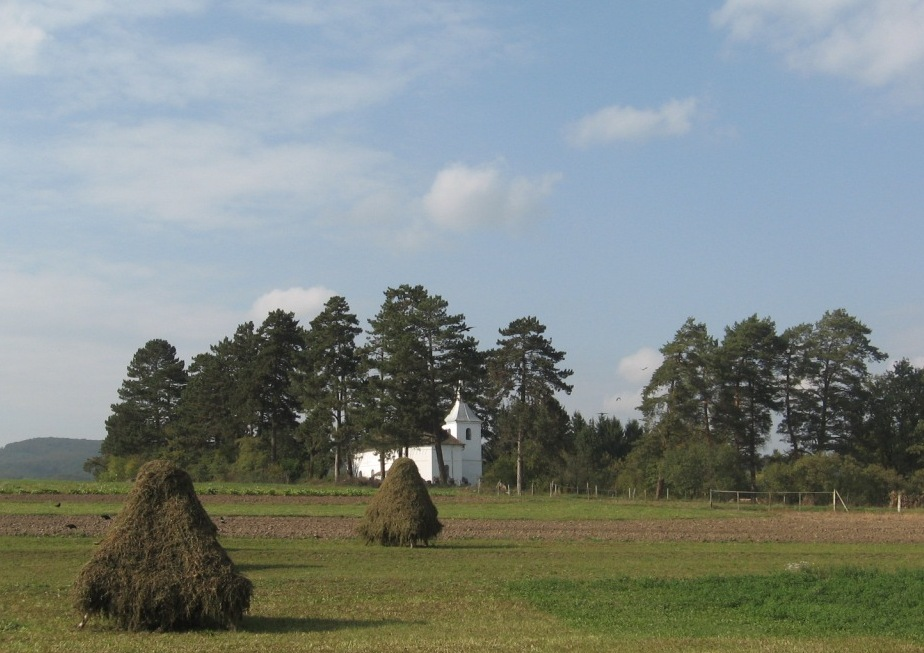
Unitarian church

Calnic

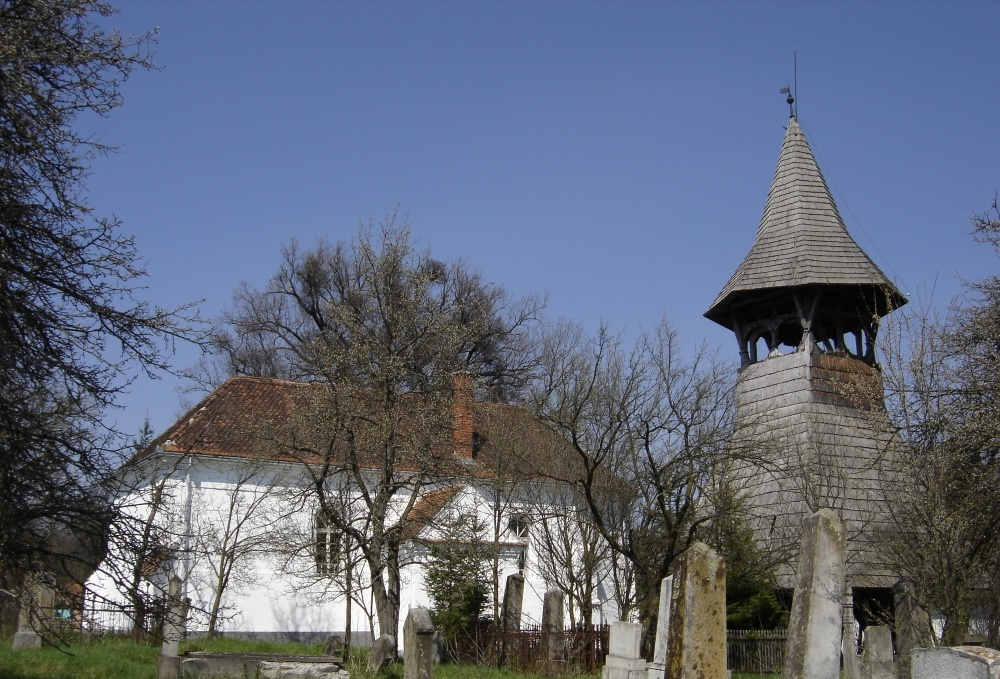
Unitarian Church and wooden belfry, 18th century

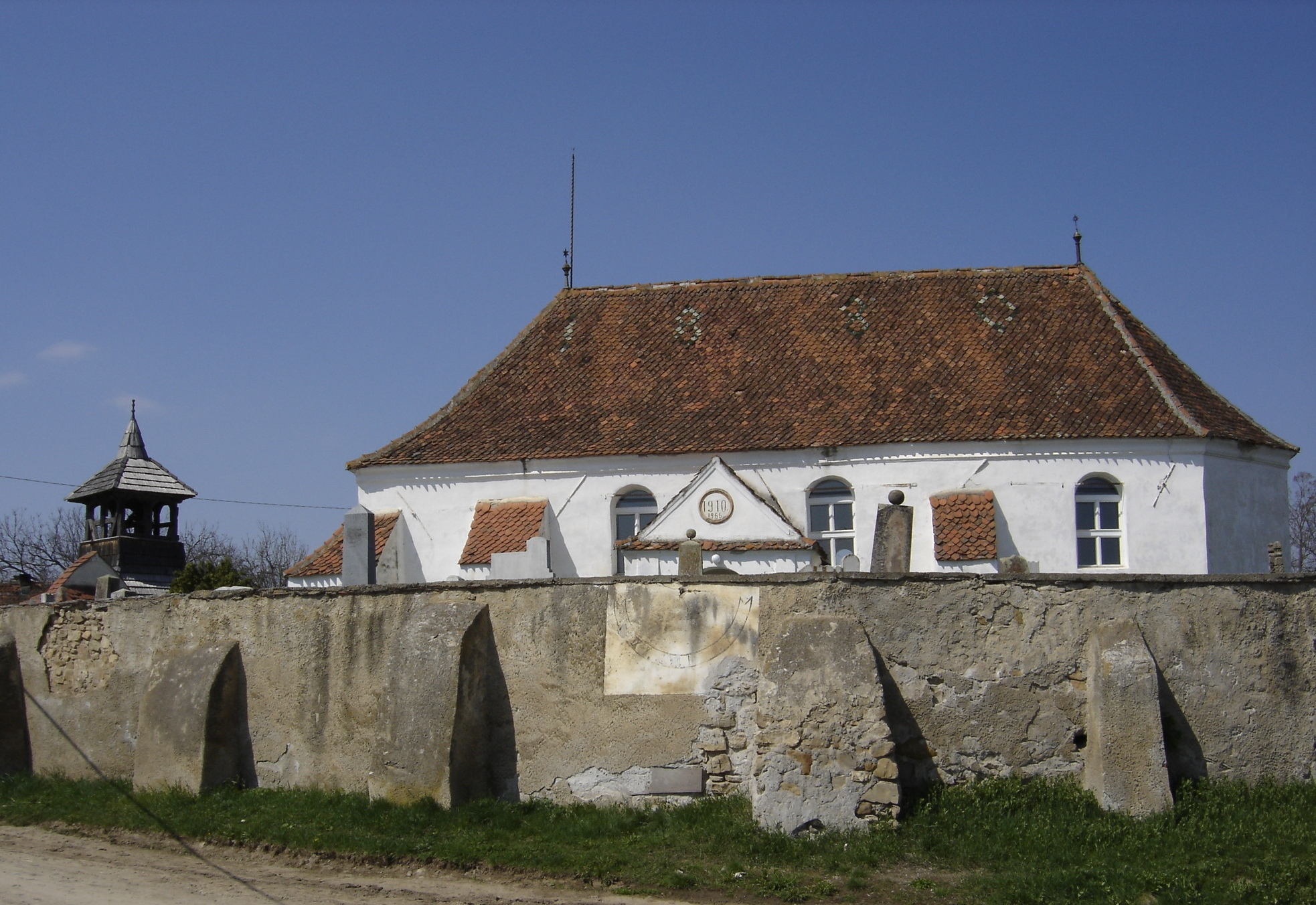
Reformed church, 15th century

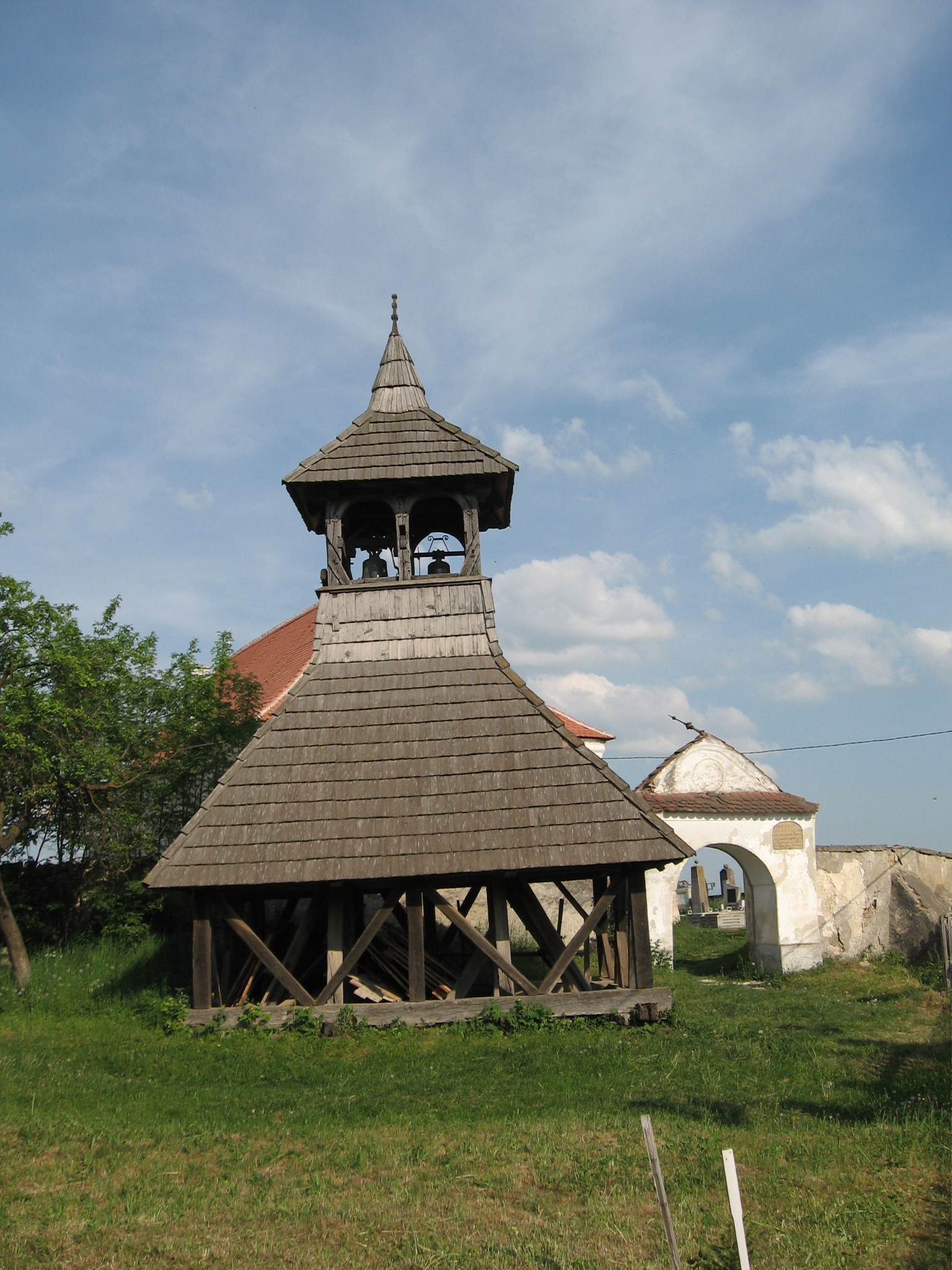
Reformed church' wooden belfry, 18th century

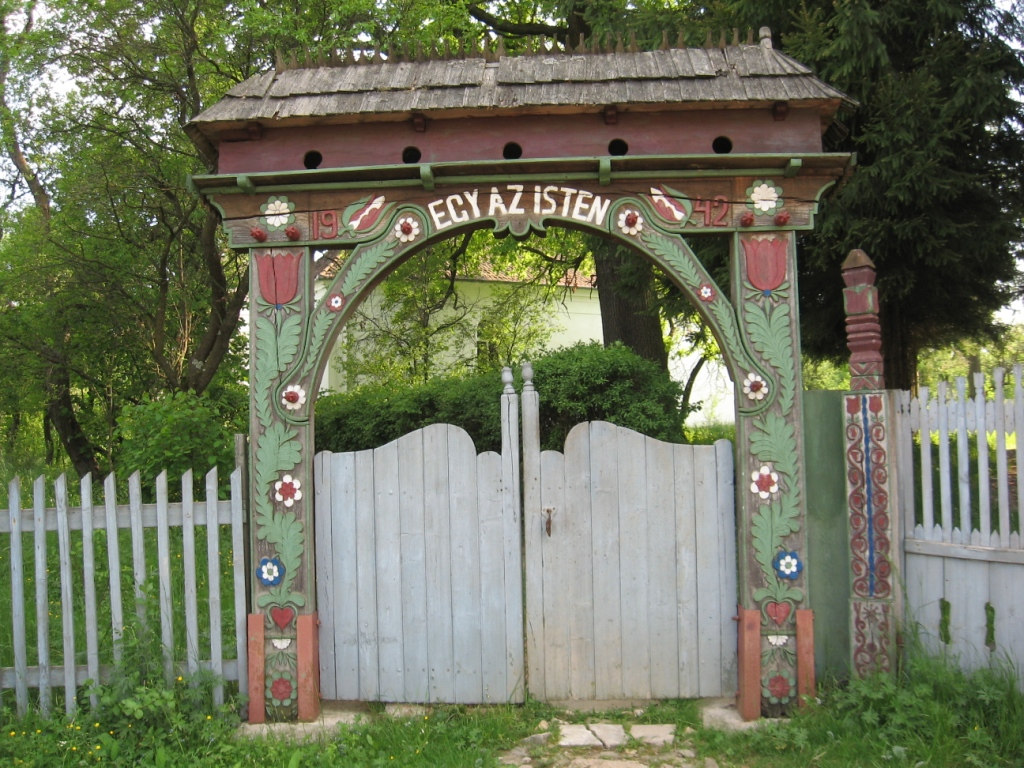
Unitarian church gate

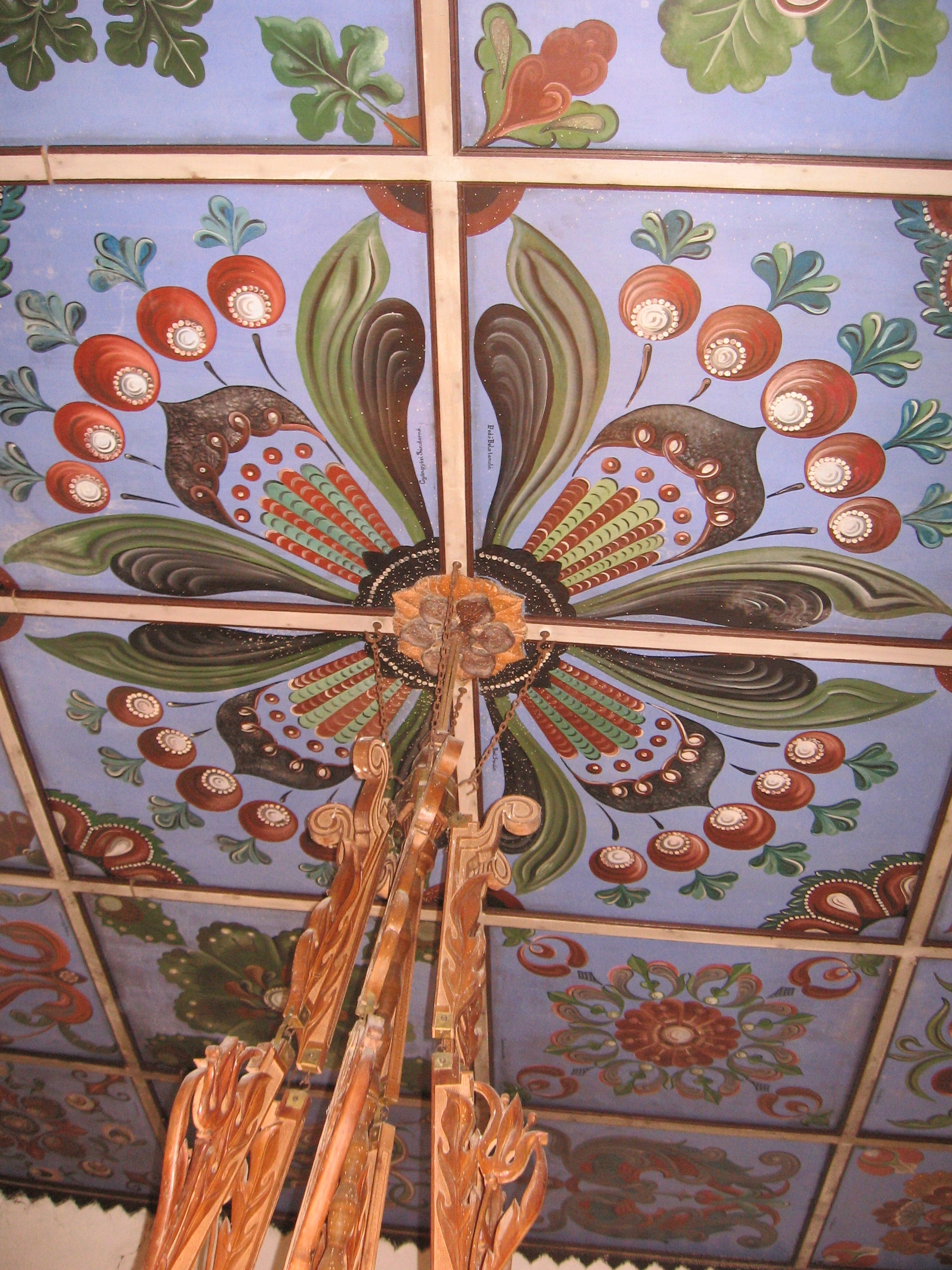
Unitarian church, flower pattern, 17th century

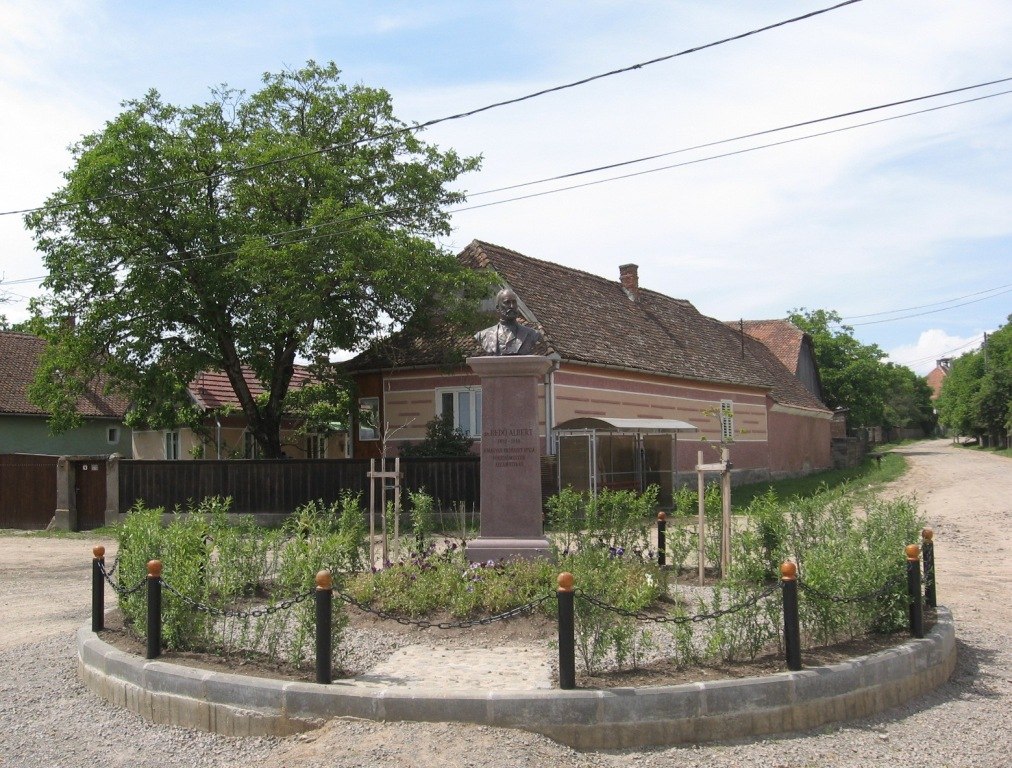
Bedő Albert statue
