= Kingdom of the Two Sicilies–United States relations =

- Two Sicilies: United States

Relations between the Kingdom of the Two Sicilies and the United States date back to 1796 when the U.S. was recognized by the Kingdom of Naples. Relations with the Kingdom continued when Naples reunified with the Kingdom of Sicily which founded the Kingdom of Two Sicilies in 1816. Formal relations were not established until 1832. Diplomatic relations ceased in 1861 when Two Sicilies was incorporated into the Kingdom of Italy.

== History ==
=== Kingdom of Naples ===
After John S. M. Matthiew was appointed as U.S. Consul to Naples on May 20, 1796, relations between the Kingdom of Naples and the U.S. formally began when Naples accepted Mattiew's credentials.

=== Kingdom of the Two Sicilies ===
After the Kingdom of Naples and Sicily merged in 1816 relations with the former Kingdom of Naples continued under the union of the Two Sicilies. While relations were not formally established in 1832, in 1816, the first interaction between both countries occurred with the reception of William Pinkney, the U.S. Special Minister Plenipotentiary to Naples. Pinkney was commissioned on April 23, 1816, with the mission to negotiate a treaty to pay reparations to U.S. merchants for ships and goods seized or confiscated during Joachim Murat rule during the Napoleonic Wars from 1809 to 1813. Pinkney's mission was unsuccessful, and in October 1816 he departed for his post at Saint Petersburg, Russia as ambassador to the Russian Empire.

Relations formally began on January 25, 1832, when John Nelson presented his credentials to King Ferdinand II. The highlight of Nelson's tenure was the signing of the Claims Convention on October 14, 1832, in Naples solving the compensation issue of American merchants whose assets were seized during the Napoleonic Wars.

Relations ended in 1860 following the Unification of Italy when the kingdom was dissolved and incorporated into a singular Italian state. As a result, the U.S. closed its mission in Naples in November, and U.S. representatives were relocated to Turin.

== Treaties ==
The Kingdom and the United States signed several treaties all of which were economic and trade-related:

- Arrangement Providing for the Reception in One Payment of the Balance of the Indemnity Remaining Under the Convention of October 14, 1832
- Treaty of Commerce and Navigation (1845)
- Convention Relative to Rights of Neutrals at Sea (1853)
- Convention of Amity, Commerce, Navigation, and Extradition (1855)

== Consuls ==
=== U.S. Consuls to Naples and Sicily ===
- John S. M. Matthiew (May 20, 1796 – March 20, 1805)
- Frederick Degan (March 20, 1805 – March 20, 1805)
- Alexander Hammett (May 20, 1796; April 20, 1816 – June 21, 1809)
- Joseph Barnes (June 21, 1809 – March 20, 1805)
- Abraham Gibbs (January 17, 1806; to Palermo)
- John Broadbent (January 17, 1806; to Messina)

=== Kingdom of Sicily Consuls to United States ===
- Ferdinando Lucchesi (appointed on May 30, 1826; also representative of the Papal States.)

== See also ==
- Foreign relations of the United States
- Italy–United States relations
- Duchy of Parma–United States relations
- Grand Duchy of Tuscany–United States relations
- Papal States–United States relations
- Kingdom of Sardinia–United States relations
- Republic of Genoa–United States relations
