= Duchy of Parma–United States relations =

- Parma: United States

The Duchy of Parma and the United States mutually recognized each other in 1850 with formal relations established in 1853. Diplomatic relations ceased in 1860 when the Duchy was incorporated into Kingdom of Sardinia then into the Kingdom of Italy the following year in 1861.

== History ==
On June 20, 1853, Secretary of State William L. Marcy addressed a note to Ángel Calderón de la Barca y Belgrano, Minister Resident of the Kingdom of Spain, stating President Zachary Taylor would receive him on the following day for the ceremony of presentation of his credentials as Envoy Extraordinary and Minister Plenipotentiary of the Duke of Parma.

Later in the month, Chevalier Rocco Martuscelli was appointed as the representative for the Duchy by Charles III to the U.S. At the time Martuscelli was the Chargé d'affaires for the Kingdom of the Two Sicilies. Given consent by the Two Sicilies government, Martuscelli presented his credentials and began serving as ambassador.

The U.S. had no diplomatic presence nor had assigned any representative to the Duchy. Instead, the Duchy maintained consular residency in San Francisco with Giovacchino Marco di Sastrustegui, the representative of the Kingdom of Spain accredited as the Consul of Parma in the Spanish Consulate-General.

Relations ended in 1860 following the Unification of Italy when the Duchy was dissolved and incorporated into a singular Italian state. Following this, the U.S. formally recognized the Kingdom of Italy when Joseph Bertinatti who was appointed as Minister Plenipotentiary of the Kingdom of Italy presented his credentials on April 11, 1861.

== See also ==
- Foreign relations of the United States
- Italy–United States relations
- Grand Duchy of Tuscany–United States relations
- Kingdom of the Two Sicilies–United States relations
- Papal States–United States relations
- Kingdom of Sardinia–United States relations
- Republic of Genoa–United States relations
