= Papal States–United States relations =

- Papal States: United States

Relations between the Papal States and the United States date back to the American Revolution when the first official contact between both countries occurred in 1784. Formal relations were not established until 1848. Diplomatic relations ceased in 1870 when the Papal States were incorporated into the Kingdom of Italy.

== History ==
The Papal States recognized the United States on December 15, 1784, when American representatives in Paris were approached by the papal nuncio and told that the Papal States "opened the ports of Civita Vecchia on the Mediterranean and Ancona on the Adriatic, to the ships of the young republic of America".

In a message to the United States Congress on December 7, 1847, President James K. Polk proposed to recognize the Papal States which resulted in funding by Congress to fund appointing a Chargé d’Affaires to the Papal States. 50 years earlier, Congress established a consulate in Rome in 1797 to facilitate commercial and legal transactions between Americans and the papal states. In 1848, Congress approved President James K. Polk's proposal to raise the consulate to a ministry. This action was designed to affirm the reformist Pope Pius IX, improve commercial prospects in Rome, gain influence in other Catholic states, and please the burgeoning Catholic vote at home.

Relations formally began in 1848 when Jacob L. Martin the first U.S. Chargé d’Affaires presented his credentials on August 19 in Rome. Martin died seven days later on August 26. Lewis Cass, Jr. was appointed afterward and accredited on November 19, 1849. On November 9, 1854, Cass presented his credentials as U.S. Minister Resident to the Pontifical States.

The first representative of the Papal States to the United States was Ferdinando Lucchesi, who was also the first representative of the Kingdom of the Two Sicilies to the United States, and whose exequatur as Consul General of the Papal States at Washington, D.C. was signed by President John Quincy Adams on May 30, 1826. Consular officers from the Papal States were stationed in various parts of the United States until 1867. Among them was a consulate in New York City.

In 1867 the American mission to the Papal States closed after Congress refused to fund the mission any longer. There were several reasons for this, ranging from religious feelings, domestic politics, and American sympathies for the Italian unification movement.

Relations ended in 1870 following the Unification of Italy, when the Papal States were dissolved and incorporated into a singular Italian state.

== See also ==
- Foreign relations of the United States
- Italy–United States relations
- Duchy of Parma–United States relations
- Grand Duchy of Tuscany–United States relations
- Kingdom of the Two Sicilies–United States relations
- Kingdom of Sardinia–United States relations
- Republic of Genoa–United States relations
