= Republic of Genoa–United States relations =

- Genoa: United States

The Republic of Genoa recognized the United States in 1791, but both countries never established formal diplomatic relations. Relations continued until 1805 when the Republic was annexed by France under Napoleon.

== History ==
Genoa recognized the United States when it sent Giuseppe Ravara: the first Consul appointed to the U.S. was accredited by President George Washington on October 25, 1791, as Consul General of the Doge and Governors of the Republic of Genoa at Philadelphia. The U.S. appointed a consul to the Republic, but according to State Department archives, the consul never arrived in Genoa. The U.S. established a consulate in Genoa in 1799.

Despite no formal relations, a key factor for relations between Genoa and the United States was mainly economic and trade purposes. The U.S. sought to promote trade abroad and to ensure that American vessels, both public and private, would be welcomed in ports around the world. As Genoa was one of the larger Mediterranean ports on the Italian peninsula in the late eighteenth century, Genovese recognition of the United States early on was beneficial to U.S. trade and commerce.

In 1805 the republic was dissolved as it was annexed by France by Napoleon ending relations between Genoa and the United States. It was briefly reconstituted in 1814 with Napoleon's defeat at Waterloo, the Congress of Vienna awarded Genoa to the Kingdom of Sardinia in 1815 with whom the U.S. had relations dating back to 1802.

== See also ==
- Foreign relations of the United States
- Italy–United States relations
- Duchy of Parma–United States relations
- Grand Duchy of Tuscany–United States relations
- Kingdom of the Two Sicilies–United States relations
- Papal States–United States relations
- Kingdom of Sardinia–United States relations
