= San Marino–United States relations =

- San Marino: United States

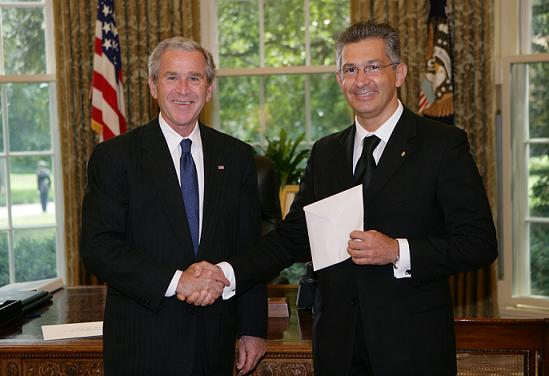
Paolo Rondelli, the first Ambassador of San Marino to the U.S., with President George W. Bush on July 16, 2007.

San Marino and the United States enjoy friendly diplomatic relations.

As of 2026, the Republic of San Marino is represented in the United States through its Permanent Mission to the United Nations in New York. San Marino does not host a physical U.S. embassy on its territory; diplomatic relations are handled by the U.S. Embassy in Rome. The U.S. Consulate General in Florence serves as the responsible diplomatic post for consular assistance and conducts consular missions in San Marino.

During the American Civil War, San Marino proposed a republican alliance with the United States, and the government made American President Abraham Lincoln an honorary citizen. He accepted the offer in a letter dated May 7, 1861, saying that the republic proved that "Although your dominion is small, your State is nevertheless one of the most honored, in all history. It has by its experience demonstrated the truth, so full of encouragement to the friends of Humanity, that Government founded on Republican principles is capable of being so administered as to be secure and enduring."

In 1906, the countries signed an extradition treaty. During World War I, the United States intervened on San Marino's behalf and attempted to free Sammarinese prisoners of war held in Austria-Hungary. However, their pleas were denied.

The two countries are on excellent terms, with San Marino consistently supporting U.S. foreign policy positions as well as U.S. candidates to international organizations. In September 2006, President George W. Bush appointed Ambassador to Italy Ronald P. Spogli to serve concurrently as Ambassador to San Marino; Spogli is the first U.S. Ambassador to San Marino in the country's history. For consular purposes, the republic is within the jurisdiction of the Florence consular district. Consulate officials regularly visit San Marino to carry out diplomatic demarches, represent U.S. interests, and administer consular services. As of May 2025, Tilman Fertitta is the U.S. ambassador to San Marino (and Italy). In July 2007, Ambassador Paolo Rondelli became San Marino's first ambassador to the U.S.

== See also ==
- Foreign relations of San Marino
- Foreign relations of the United States
