= Grand Duchy of Tuscany–United States relations =

- Tuscany: United States

The Grand Duchy of Tuscany and the United States formally recognized each other in 1794, but never formally established diplomatic relations. Despite this, both countries appointed representatives and established diplomatic offices until 1860 when the Grand Duchy was incorporated into the Kingdom of Italy.

== History ==
During the American Revolution and the American Revolutionary War the Continental Congress appointed Ralph Izard Commissioner to the Court of the Grand Duke of Tuscany on July 1, 1777. Izard's main role was to secure funding for the war by asking Grand Duke Ferdinand for a million dollars. Izard never arrived in Tuscany learning in advance of the high probability that Ferdinand would refuse to receive him in Florence for fear of upsetting the British. The Duchy maintained good ties with England and its navy in the Mediterranean to maintain trade and commercial ties. The Continental Congress terminated Izard's mission on June 8, 1779, once it became clear the Duchy would not recognize the United States.

The Grand Duchy recognized the United States in 1794 when it received the first U.S. consular agent to serve within the grand duchy, Philip Felicchi who was stationed at Livorno from May 24, 1794, to December 7, 1796. Despite giving recognition to the U.S., the Duchy refused to recognize American consular agents posted in Florence. The first representative appointed by the American government to Tuscany was Giacomo Ombrosi, who was serving at his post in Florence as Vice Consular, and was accredited on May 15, 1819. Ombrosi's appointment was refused by Grand Duke Ferdinand. According to State Magazine, "Ombrosi improvised as a 'Black Market Consul,' living outside the medieval walls and setting up shop at a cafe to provide services." In 1823, President James Monroe named Ombrosi as consul, but it was not until Tuscany became part of the Kingdom of Italy in 1860 that the host government formally recognized the U.S. Consul General in Florence.

The Duchy appointed John F. Mansony as their first representative to the U.S. also as exequatur as Consul for the states of New Hampshire, Massachusetts, Rhode Island, Vermont, and Connecticut residing in Boston whose appointment was signed by President Monroe on November 6, 1817. All representatives of the Duchy were consular officers. The last representative of Tuscany to the United States was G.B. Tagliaferri, whose exequatur as Consul at New York was signed by President Franklin Pierce on November 1, 1854.

Despite no formality of relations, both countries made several attempts to sign a treaty of commerce. The earliest of such attempts was in 1784 when U.S. Ministers Plenipotentiary Benjamin Franklin, John Adams, and Thomas Jefferson tried to negotiate a treaty of amity and commerce between the two states. By January 1785, the process of negotiating such an agreement never came to be for unknown reasons.

Relations ended in 1860 following the Unification of Italy when the Grand Duchy was dissolved and incorporated into a singular Italian state.

== See also ==
- Foreign relations of the United States
- Italy–United States relations
- Duchy of Parma–United States relations
- Kingdom of the Two Sicilies–United States relations
- Papal States–United States relations
- Kingdom of Sardinia–United States relations
- Republic of Genoa–United States relations
