= Ederle =

Ederle (Italian: [ˈɛːderle]) is a surname that refers to:

- Carlo Ederle (1892–1917), Italian engineer and army officer; recipient of the Military Order of Italy for action in World War I
- Gertrude Ederle (1905–2003), American swimmer; first woman to swim across the English Channel
