= Nathaniel Niles =

Nathaniel Niles may refer to:

- Nathaniel Niles (figure skater) (1886–1932), American figure skater and tennis player
- Nathaniel Niles (politician) (1741–1828), United States Representative from Vermont
- Nathaniel Niles Jr. (1791–1869), U.S. diplomat
