= Carlo Ederle =

Italian military engineer

Major Carlo Ederle (Italian pronunciation: [ˈkarlo ˈɛːderle]; 1892 – December 4, 1917) was an Italian military engineer.

== Life and career ==
Born in Verona, Italy, he attended the royal liceo ginnasio "Scipione Maffei" and received his diploma at the age of 17. He registered at the Engineer School at the University of Padua and was awarded the degree of Engineer ad honorem on November 12, 1910.

At the Military Academy in Turin, he graduated first of 200 artillery second lieutenants. Appointed to the rank of lieutenant in 1913, Ederle was assigned to the 8th Field Artillery.

In April 1915, he was promoted to captain, and appointed commanding officer at the Artillery Training Center in Cirié (Turin), after serving at the Cadore front. But he requested, and was granted, permission to return to the front, where he commanded a heavy field battery at the Sei Busi mountain area.

In 1916, Ederle was wounded in the shoulder but did not want to go to the hospital. While still convalescing, he returned to the front, despite military doctors' admonitions. In May 1916, he was wounded again. He wrote to his parents that the press reports were greatly exaggerated, and that he had not even gone to the hospital.

In November of the same year, Ederle served as part of the Third Army Artillery Headquarters, which had the role of neutralizing the enemy's artillery efforts. In December, when Italian troops withdrew from the front to regroup and reorganize, a colonel told Ederle he was going to recommend him for promotion and reassignment away from the front because he had skirted death too often "with a smile on his face."

But, says one report, Ederle refused promotion consideration if it meant he would not remain at the front.

During the afternoon of December 4, 1917, Ederle went to an observation point at the bend of Zenson on the Piave River, accompanied by a lieutenant. While observing the enemy, he was shot in the head by an enemy machine gunner. At 2:30 p.m., Carlo Ederle was dead at the age of 25.

Ederle was nominated for lieutenant colonel and knight of the Military Order of Savoy, and received high official praise. He was awarded the Silver Medal of Military Valor three times and the Croix de guerre with palms by France. He was posthumously awarded the Gold Medal of Military Valour by the King.

== Namesakes ==
- Caserma Ederle, or the U.S. Army Garrison Vicenza, is a U.S. Army post in Vicenza, Italy, and was named after Carlo Ederle in honor of his heroism during World War I.
