= Palazzo Canevaro =

Coordinates: 43°46′26″N 11°14′27″E

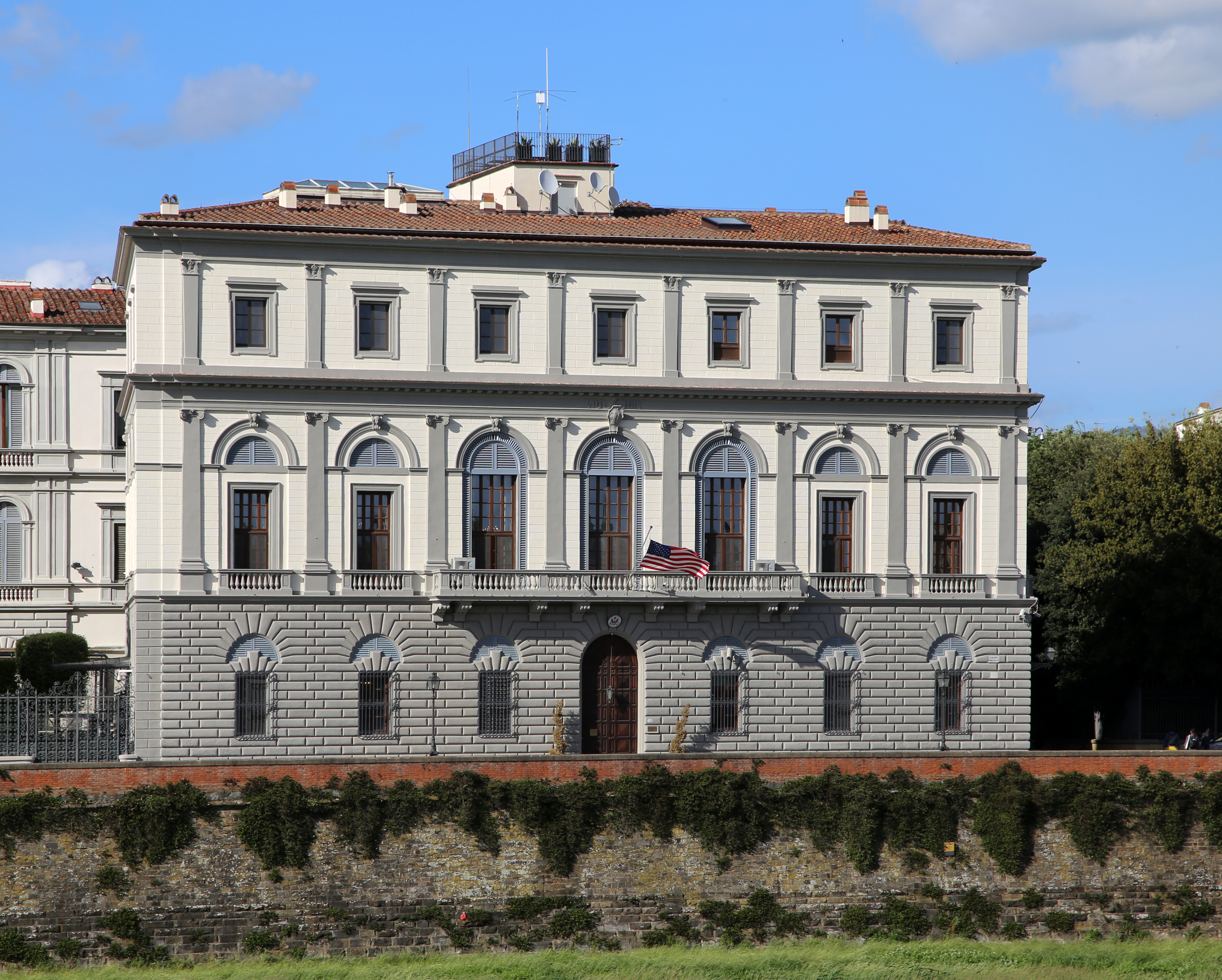
- Palazzo Canevaro, 2021
- Interactive map of the Palazzo Canevaro area

General information
- Architectural style: Renaissance revival
- Location: Lungarno Amerigo Vespucci 38, Florence, Italy
- Completed: 1857
- Owner: Consulate-General of the United States, Florence

Technical details
- Floor count: 3

Design and construction
- Architect: Giuseppe Poggi

Palazzo Canevaro, also known as Palazzo Calcagnini, is a 19th-century palace in Florence, Italy. Designed by architect Giuseppe Poggi in the late 1850s for the wealthy Calcagnini family, it passed through the ownership of various aristocrats, before becoming the headquarters for the Consulate-General of the United States in Florence in 1947.

== Construction ==
In the mid-19th century, an area in Florence along the north shore of the Arno river near the Parco delle Cascine was subject to significant development, bolstered by the construction of roads along the Arno's embankments and the Ponte San Leopoldo bridge. Many wealthy nobles and elites commissioned residences in this area, dubbed the Nuovo Quartiere delle Cascine. In 1854, the Marquis Manfredi Calcagnini Estense, a member of the wealthy Calcagnini family, moved to Florence and purchased a lot along the Arno, becoming one of the first people to construct a residence in the area.

Calcagnini divided the lot into plots for a residence, a garden, and stables. He commissioned Giuseppe Poggi, one of the city's most noted architects, to design the building. Poggi had designed a series of Renaissance Revival houses in Florence over the previous years. Calcagnini's property already had walls and a foundation constructed by a previous owner. Poggi wrote that the "unfavorable perimeter, the ties to the old foundation and the prescription to form a stately dwelling in such a limited and irregular surface area" resulted in a difficult design process. The building was completed in 1859, and Calcagnini subsequently moved into the building alongside his wife Sofia Ruschi.

=== Architecture ===
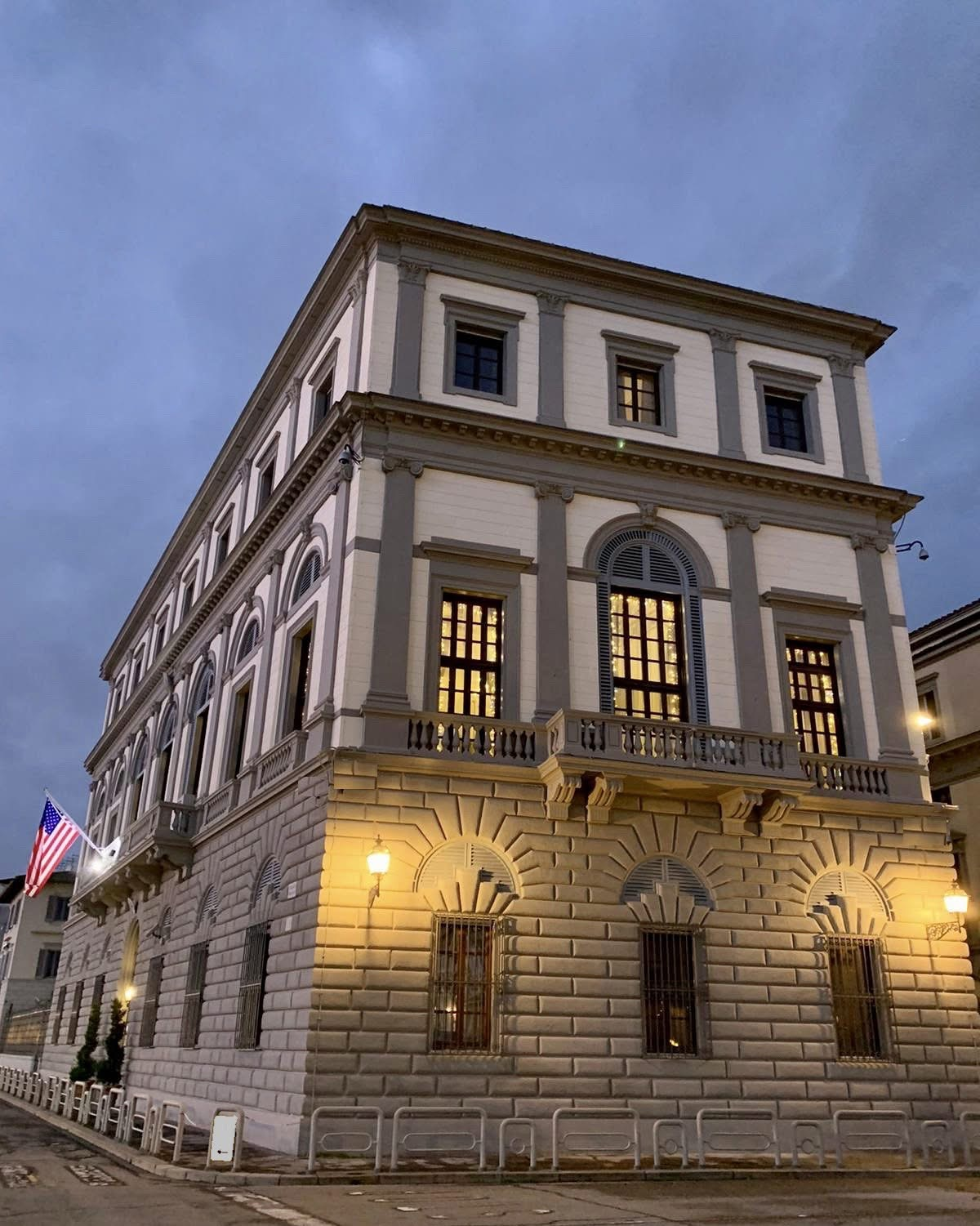
The Palazzo from the side at night

The Palazzo Canevaro is located on a trapezoidal lot, bordered by the Corso Italia (formerly the Via Vittorio Emanuele) to the north, the Via Palestro to the east, the Lungarno Vespucci road along the river to the south, and the Via Giuseppe Garibaldi to the west.

Poggi incorporated various elements of Florentine Renaissance architecture into the Palazzo. It consists of three stories. The front facade of the first story is made of imitation ashlar, with a main entryway and three windows on either side of the residence. The second story facade is a masonry stringcourse, with a small central terrace and seven arched windows separated by Ionic columns. The top story facade has seven small rectangular windows flanked by Corinthian columns.

The interior of the Palazzo has a large entryway, with a main entrance on the Lugarno and a smaller entrance on the Corso Italia. There is a staircase on the ground floor accessing the main floor of the building, while a secondary staircase from the kitchen accesses other floors, as well as the cellars and mezzanine.

== History ==
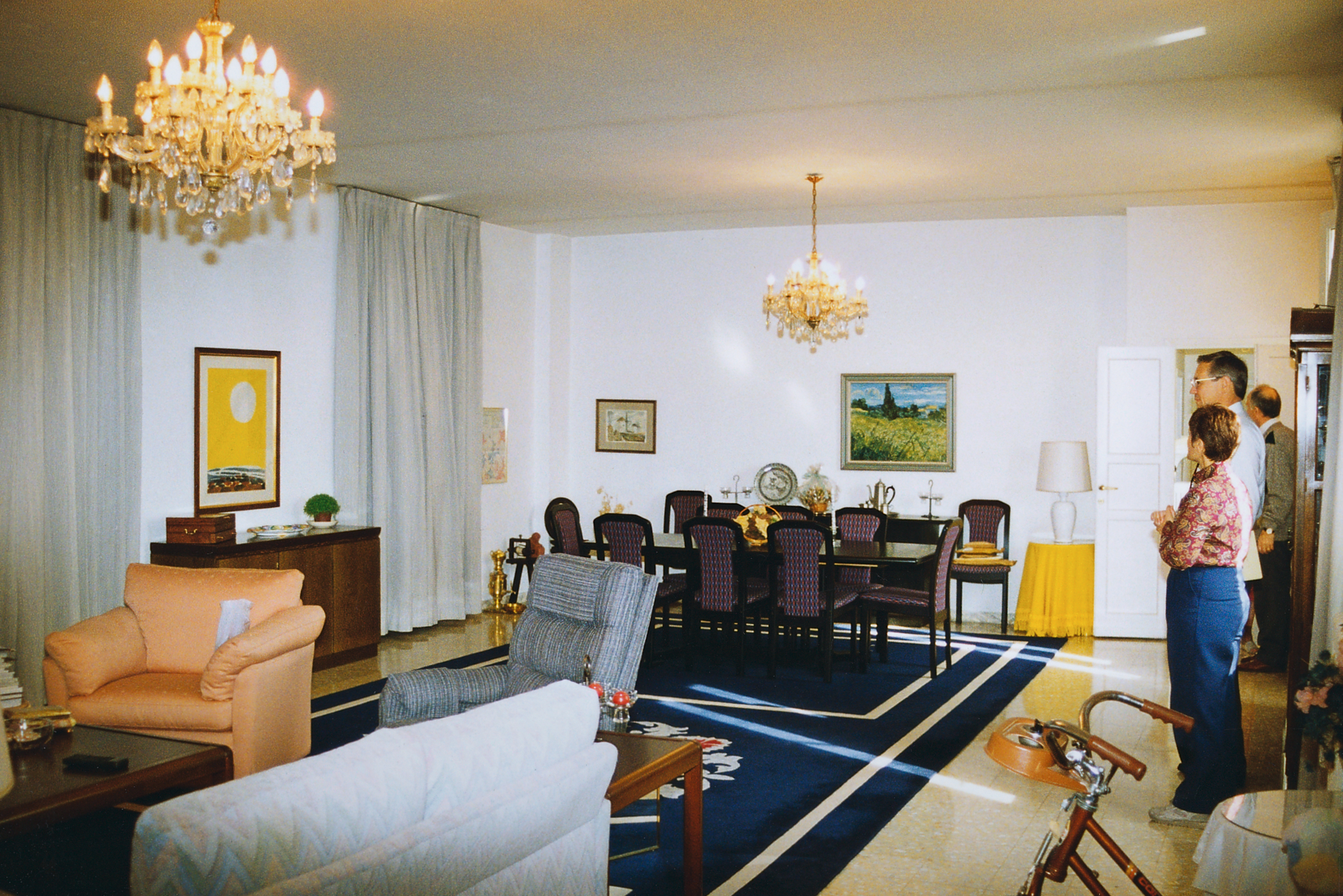
The interior of the Palazzo as a US consulate, late 20th century

Around 1866, the Calcagninis sold the building to Francesco Benedetto Arese Lucini, an aristocrat and senator, who died there in 1881. In early 1900, it was purchased by the nobleman Giuseppe Canevaro. The Canevaros were a powerful and well-connected family in both Italian and Peruvian politics. Architect Raffaello Morozzi performed restoration on the building's facades in 1903.

Walter Orebaugh, a United States Foreign Service officer serving as the American consul to Florence, purchased the building and its gardens to serve as the headquarters of the Consulate-General of the United States, Florence in December 1947. In the year following the purchase, the architect Tullio Rossi remodeled the building to allow it to serve as a consulate. It was a disaster relief coordination center after the 1966 Arno floods, directing volunteers who cleaned the city and salvaged works of art and literature. The building's use as a Consulate-General required the implementation of various security measures in the surrounding area, including a ban on vehicular traffic on the adjacent streets.

In 2012, the American Secretary of State, Hillary Clinton, listed the site on the State Department's international heritage register, the Register of Culturally Significant Property. A complete renovation of the building's facades was performed in the early 2020s, reconstructing missing portions and attaching them to the structure using mortar and fiberglass rods.

The Florence Consulate-General was one of many consulates that the State Department considered closing in 2025, but it was confirmed to stay open that July after intervention by the American ambassador to Italy, Tilman Fertitta.
