= Caserma Ederle =

Military base in Vicenza, Italy

Coordinates: 45°32′32.70″N 11°34′42.62″E

Change of command ceremony at Caserma Ederle.

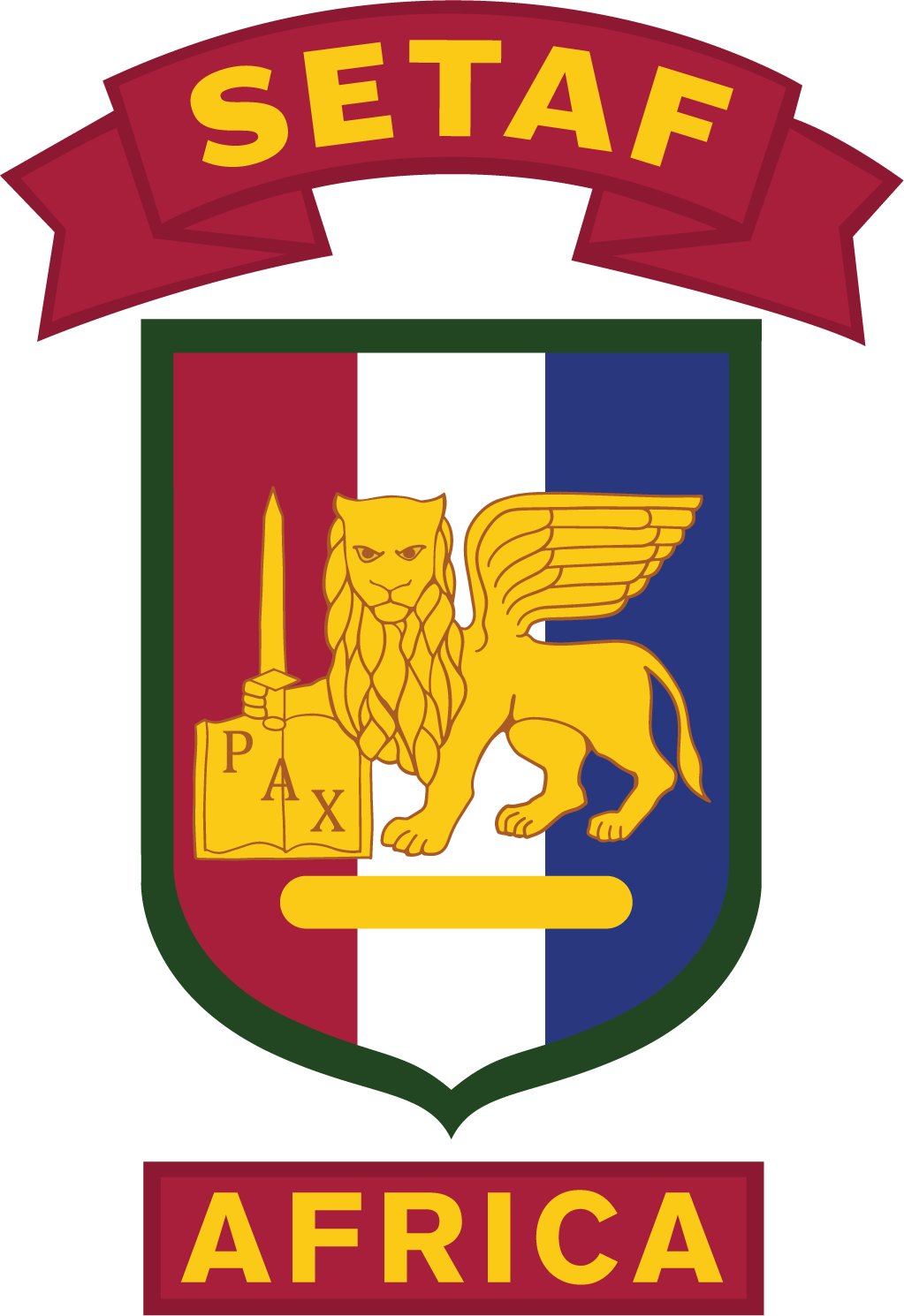
Shoulder Sleeve Insignia (SSI) of US Army's Command for Africa

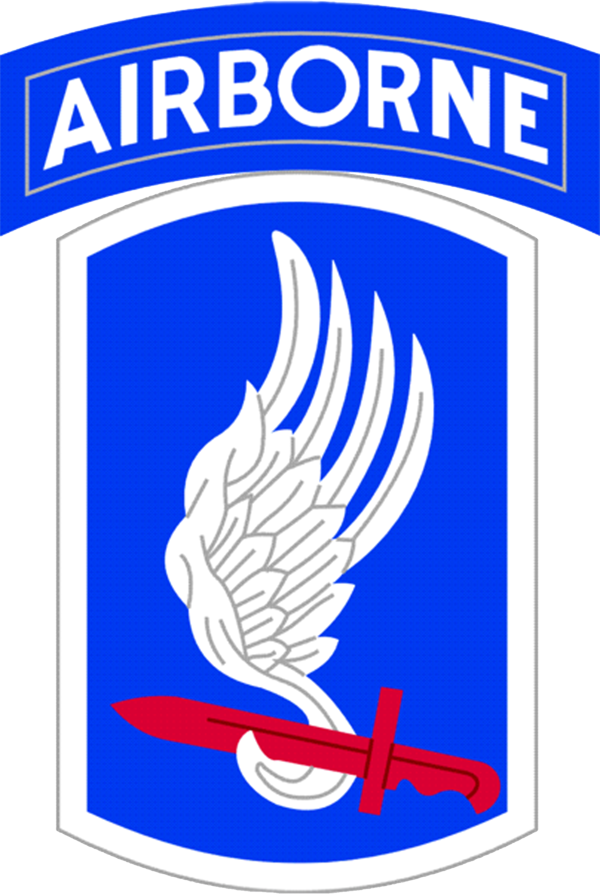
SSI of the 173rd Airborne Brigade

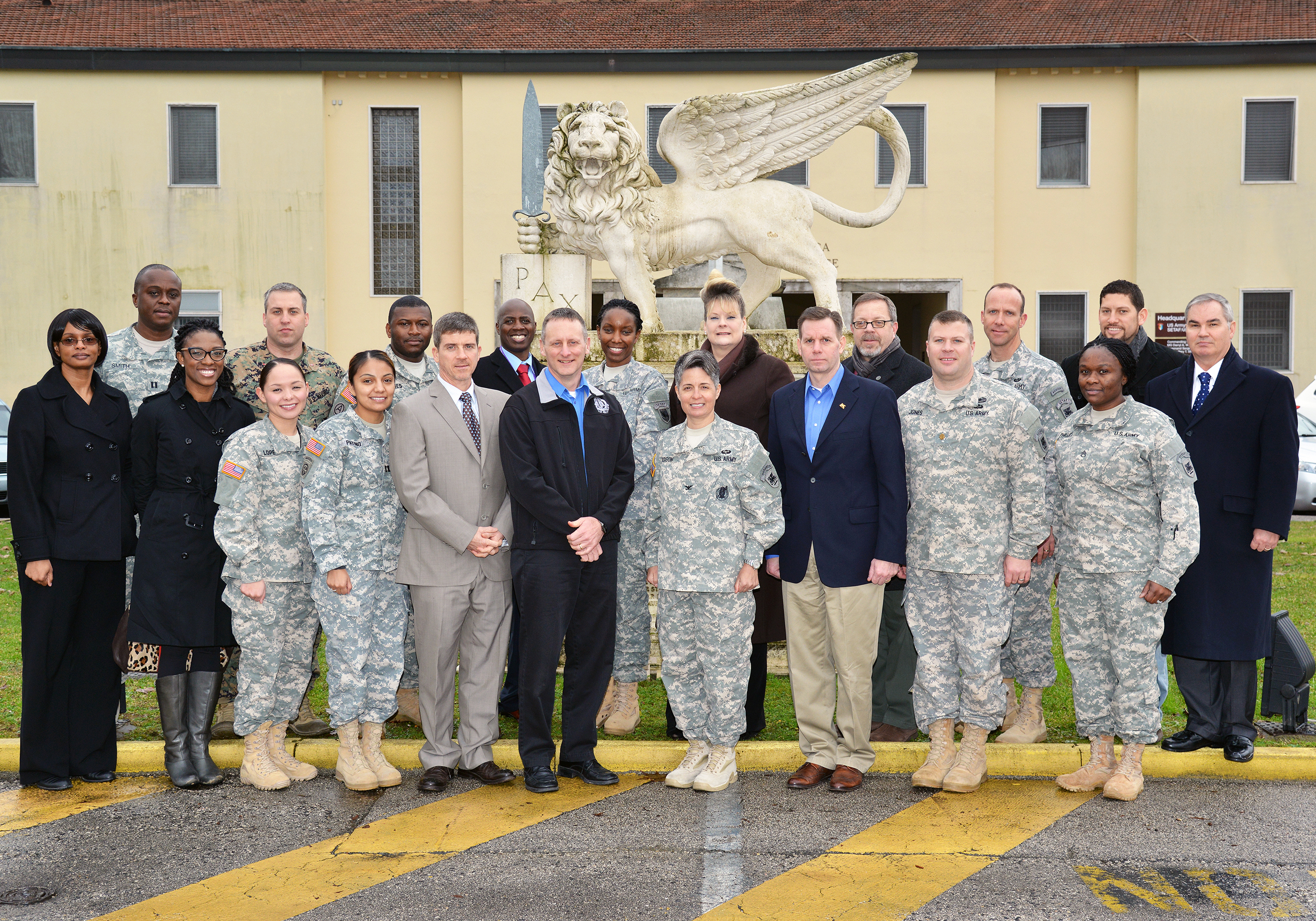
Soldiers and civilians pose near the Lion of Saint Mark at the entrance to the Caserma

Caserma Ederle (Camp Ederle) is a military complex in Vicenza, Italy, where the United States Army has troops stationed. It is under Italian military control and can be managed anytime by the Italian authorities. The Vicenza Military Community is composed of soldiers, family members, civilians and retirees with a small number of airmen and sailors also stationed there. The post serves as the headquarters of United States Army Africa and the 173rd Airborne Brigade. Caserma Ederle serves as the headquarters of U.S. Army Garrison Italy of the United States Army Installation Management Command, an umbrella for all U.S. military properties in Vicenza. The post is named after Major Carlo Ederle, an Italian hero of World War I and recipient of the French Croix de Guerre (French War Cross), among other military honors.

== Garrison ==
The current formations which form part of the camp include:

- U.S. Army Southern European Task Force, Africa Headquarters
- 509th Signal Battalion
- 3/529th Military Police Company
- 173rd Airborne Brigade Combat Team
- 14th Transportation Battalion
- Detachment E, 106th Finance Management Company
- U.S. Army Health Clinic/Dental Clinic – Vicenza

== Life on the Caserma (camp) ==
Soldiers assigned to a tour of duty at Caserma Ederle are normally permitted to bring family members when being reassigned there upon a Permanent Change of Station. Still, many of the military personnel assigned to Caserma Ederle are unaccompanied.

The post offers virtually all of the standard amenities present on most U.S. military installations, such as a Post Exchange, commissary, theater, etc. Single or unaccompanied junior enlisted soldiers live primarily in barracks located on the post itself, or in leased government quarters in the local community. Depending on the availability of housing upon arrival, personnel accompanied by dependents can live in housing quarters, Italian houses rented by the U.S. Government, government-owned housing units, or pay for accommodation outside the base. Government-owned housing units for accompanied soldiers and their dependents are located in a separate and gated/secure area of Vicenza known as Villaggio della Pace (literally "Village of the Peace", but actually named after the street passing near the village and the camp - Viale della Pace). Single officers pay for accommodation outside the base.

== History ==
=== 1955–1990 ===
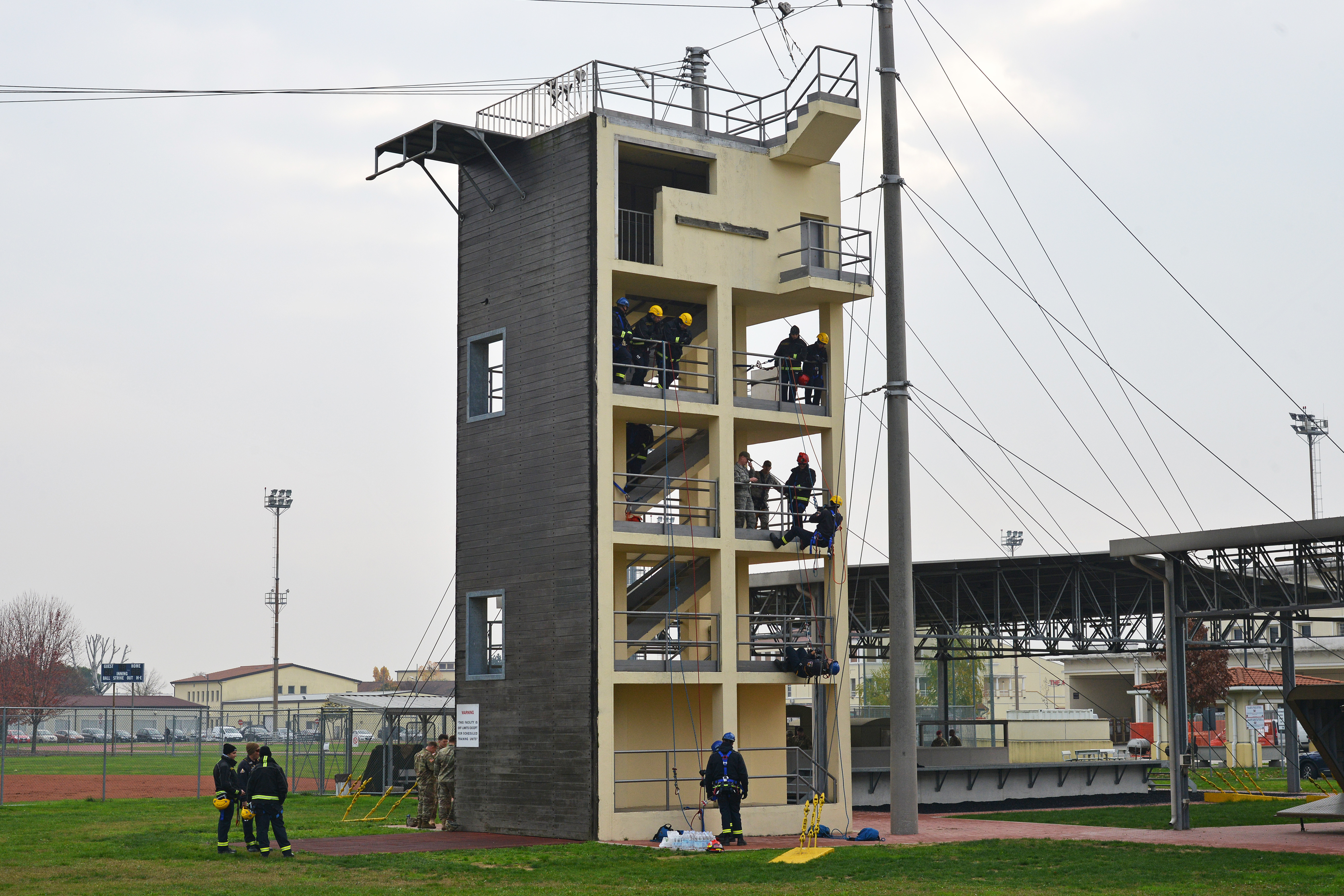
Camp Ederle

In 1951, the U.S. and Italy signed an agreement that the U.S. would operate lines of communication across Italy, and that the U.S. would occupy land near Livorno. This land became Camp Darby, located in Pisa, named for Brigadier General William O. Darby, who was killed in action in northern Italy on 30 April 1945.

In 1955, all U.S. occupation forces in Austria were withdrawn upon the entry into force of the Austrian State Treaty. Under provisions of the agreement with Italy, Camp Darby was the initial reception station for soldiers, equipment and supplies returning from Austria.

With Austria now neutral, northern Italy's eastern flank became vulnerable to attack. To reduce the danger in that area, the U.S. agreed to establish a force there and on 2 October 1955, the U.S. Army Southern European Task Force (SETAF) was activated. SETAF's first headquarters was on Camp Darby, but the largest number of soldiers has always been in Vicenza, Italy. Shortly after activation, USASETAF headquarters moved to Verona, Italy. Troop strength reached 10,000 and USASETAF was formally established via a U.S.-Italian agreement.

In 1959, following President Dwight D. Eisenhower's visit to Rome, a third agreement brought significant changes to USASETAF. Italy's military forces were re-established. As a result, U.S. troop strength was cut in half; equipment from disbanded U.S. units was turned over to Italy; and Italian Army personnel were assigned to the USASETAF general staff to assist with unique bi-national responsibilities.

As a result of this agreement, the 62nd Engineers and an artillery company were moved to Caserma Passalacqua. Both companies had nuclear weapons. The artillery company's Sergeant missiles had nuclear warheads and the engineering company was an ADM (Atomic Demolition Munitions) engineering unit.

The headquarters moved again in 1965 from Verona to Caserma Ederle. Caserma Ederle had already existed as an Italian post. Soldier strength dropped to 2,500 in 1970 and civilian employment went down 70 percent in a unilateral cost-reduction effort. The port opened by 8th Area Support Group in Livorno was returned to Italian control.

On 20 October 1973, the 5th Battalion (Sergeant Missile), 30th Field Artillery was activated in Caserma Ederle. LTC Ronald E. Little assumed command of the 5th Battalion, which consisted of A, B, and Headquarters batteries. The 5th Battalion, 30th Field Artillery was inactivated on 15 December 1975.

SETAF's mission and geographical area of responsibility increased in 1972 when the command enlarged its signal support unit and took control of the 558th U.S. Army Artillery Group (USAAG) in Greece and the 528th USAAG in Turkey. These units had been in support of NATO since the early 1960s, along with the 559th USAAG, which had been a USASETAF unit in Italy since 1964. The 509th Infantry Regiment (Airborne Battalion Combat Team - ABCT) was previously placed under the command of SETAF in 1973 and later inactivated in the mid-1980s; it was replaced by the 4th Battalion, 325th Infantry Regiment. The 4/325th ABCT was composed of three line companies (including a COHORT company) Alpha, a headquarters company, a combat-support company, and a 105mm artillery battery. A member of NATO's Allied Mobile Forces (Land), the 4/325th ABCT was the right flank element of the European front during the late Cold War and was deployable by parachute to anywhere in the region.

The 3/325 ABCT (Blue Falcons), occupied Caserma Ederle during the late 1980s as a contingent of the Army's Southern European Task Force. The 3/325 ABCT specialized in airfield seizures, and one of the most likely deployment scenarios during the Cold War was to attack and gain control of an airfield behind enemy lines of the USSR to provide a point into which more forces from the U.S. could build a stronghold. They trained extensively in cold weather tactics and operations in a specialized base in Folgaria, Italy. They deployed annually to train in Turkey, usually as part of joint operations training among other airborne units within SETAF, to include the British, French, Spanish, Italian, German, Turkish, etc. They also trained extensively in Grafenwöhr, West Germany. The 3/325th was also trained as a Military Operations in Urban Terrain unit.

The primary missions of SETAF during the 1980s were the defense of the eastern Alpine passes in anticipation of a Soviet invasion, and command/control of the nuclear weapons stockpiles still located in northern Italy.

Also stationed here was the 45th Field Hospital, US Army Medical Activity (USAMEDDAC), part of the 7th Medical Command. The 45th Field Hospital was a 26-bed hospital supporting the troops stationed at Caserma Ederle. The health clinic at Camp Darby, Livorno, was supported by the 45th Field Hospital as well as the health clinic at Sinop, Turkey.

=== 1990s–present ===
The 1st Battalion, 508th Infantry Regiment was stationed at Caserma Ederle from April 1996 until it was reflagged as the 1st Battalion, 503rd Infantry Regiment in June 2006.

Until 1992, USASETAF was considered a logistical command. In addition to the infantry units, SETAF operated a major depot at Camp Darby in conjunction with the 8th Area Support Group. With its designation as a support command and later a theater army area command, USASETAF was to be responsible for the reception, preparation for combat, and onward movement of forces entering the southern region for general war.

The political reorientation of Europe in 1989 and 1990 resulting from the end of the Cold War caused major revision of U.S. and NATO military priorities. With the drastic reduction of the threat of general war, SETAF received new missions for regional tactical operations as command and control headquarters for U.S. Army and joint units. Its three artillery groups were inactivated and the two support groups became support groups with unique missions. The 8th Area Support Group's depot operation developed into the maintenance and issue of theater reserve stocks organized in unit sets sufficient to fully equip a heavy brigade.

The 3rd Battalion of the 325th Regiment also served during this period and were successful in the campaign of "Operation Provide Comfort", during the first Gulf War in Iraq. They were commanded by Lieutenant Colonel (later General) John P. Abizaid, who later commanded U.S. Central Command (CENTCOM) from July 2003 to March 2007.

A reorganization to command structure created USAG (United States Army Garrison)-Vicenza to handle the (non-combatant forces) installation activities of Caserma Ederle.

== Dal Molin/Del Din Planned Post Annex ==
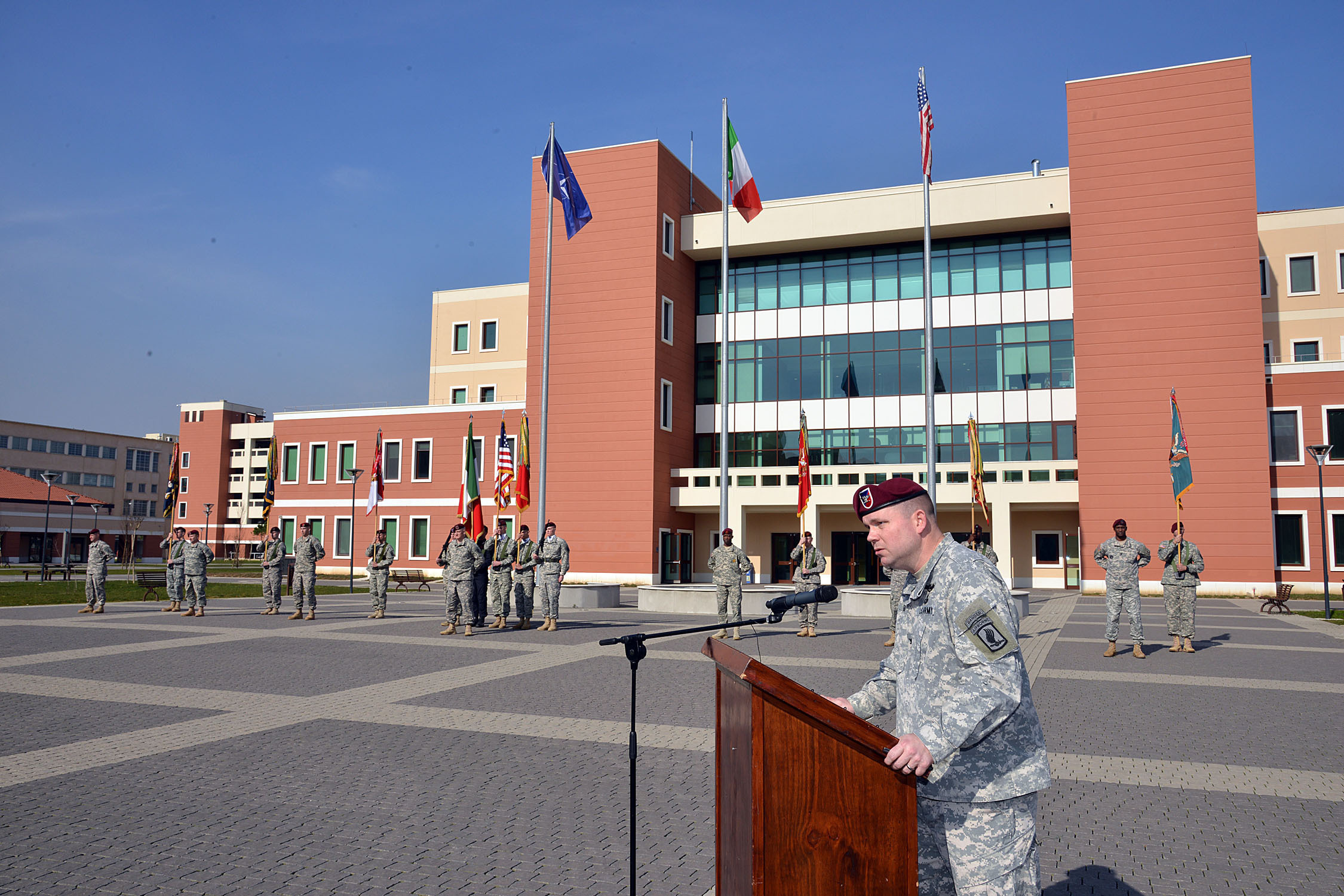
Camp Del Din

In 2004, the U.S. military announced plans to extend the military footprint in Vicenza to include all elements of the 173rd ABCT. The new base annex was planned to be located on the disused civilian Dal Molin Airport, roughly 2 miles (3.2 km) from Caserma Ederle. The plan was first agreed by Italian Prime Minister Silvio Berlusconi's administration. The succeeding government, led by Romano Prodi, initially opposed the expansion, but eventually agreed to the extension plan. The Italian Ministry of Defense has announced the redesignation of the installation from Dal Molin to Caserma Del Din upon transfer to the Italian Army. The work is managed by the Transition Construction Management Office and construction oversight is by the Naval Facilities Engineer Command, Resident Officer in Charge of Construction.

On October 30, 2012 during a special ceremony in Rome honoring Paolo Costa, the U.S. Ambassador David Thorne credited the success of Del Din to the strong support that the United States received from the highest levels of the Italian government, including the executive, legislative and judicial branches over several years and by several different governments. This facility will be the first DoD installation to obtain the Leadership in Energy and Environmental Design (LEED) Silver certification with the potential to achieve gold certification.

Vicenza is eventually slated to be home to the 173rd Airborne Brigade and the United States Army Africa headquarters. Currently, only two infantry battalions and portions of the brigade's two support battalions are in Vicenza, and the move would bring the total number of stationed troops in Vicenza to 5,000.

== Camp Darby ==
In 2012 the US Army announced that USAG Livorno/Camp Darby will be downgraded from a US Army Garrison (USAG) to a sub-Garrison called Darby Military Community reporting to USAG Italy at Caserma Ederle.

== See also ==
- List of United States Army installations in Italy
- History of the Italian Republic
