= List of United States Army installations in Italy =

The United States Army has military complexes (bases are Italian territory and can be managed anytime by the Italian State authorities, as the Sigonella crisis showed) in Italy:

- Caserma Del Din, near Vicenza (northern Italy, in the Veneto region; HQ of 173rd Airborne Brigade Combat Team, also part of US Army Africa.)
- Caserma Ederle, near Vicenza (northern Italy, in the Veneto region — HQ of the United States Army Africa and of the US 173rd Airborne Brigade)
- Darby Military Community, formerly Camp Darby, located in the province of Pisa, halfway between Pisa and Livorno. A 1951 US-Italian agreement conceded to the Pentagon the transformation of thousands of acres of Tuscan woods in a secret military base. The complex is named in honour of William O. Darby, founder of the US 1st Ranger Battalion, who died on the battlefield in Italy in 1945 (see it:Camp Darby).

== See also ==
- List of United States military bases
- United States military deployments
- Foreign relations of Italy
- List of Over 100 Military Installations in Italy, with Map and Descriptions
