= Istituto Maffei =

Coordinates: 45°26′43″N 10°59′56.56″E

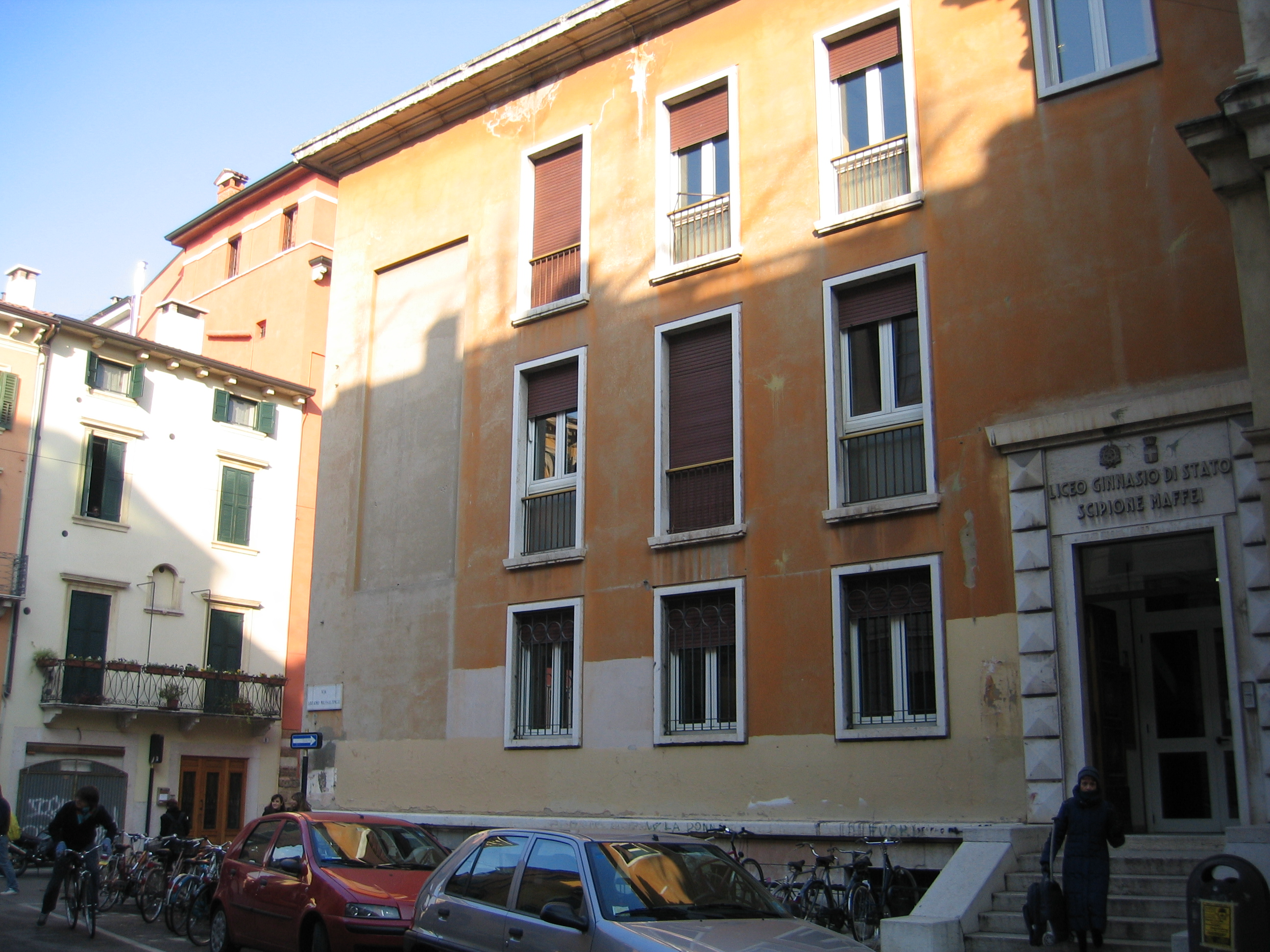
The building of Via Massalongo 4

Istituto Maffei, officially called Liceo Statale 'Scipione Maffei', is one of the oldest high schools in Italy. It is situated in the center of Verona in northern Italy.

It is a grammar school, with students who focus on the classics and can choose different paths: communication, or languages. Students who choose the first path study Latin, Ancient Greek, Mathematics, Biology, Physics, Chemistry, Philosophy, History, Geography, Italian and Italian literature, English and English literature, I.T, Law and Economy. Students who, on the other hand choose the second path study the same subjects (apart from Ancient Greek) plus some other modern languages like French, Spanish or German.

It was officially founded in 1808 under the name "Liceo con Convitto", although it was actually already in operation in 1805. Then in 1867 it was renamed "Regio Liceo Scipione Maffei", after an Italian writer and art critic, author of many articles and plays.

== War period ==
One of the most important periods in its history is the First World War. At that time both teachers and students wanted Italy to take part in that war, but when the conflict started, the school experienced difficulty caused by economic problems for teachers and the fear of fighting for many students. Eighty students and one teacher, named Enrico Sicher, died during Austrian attacks. They are now commemorated with a plaque in the school.

== The school today ==
The school classes are currently divided into two different buildings in Via Abramo Massalongo 4 and in Via Sebastiano Venier 6.

The school hosts a physics museum, containing examples of antique experimental instruments. There is also an antique library holding about 25,000 volumes including both historical and modern books.

== Honors ==
On December 14, 2004, Italian president Carlo Azeglio Ciampi presented to the school the Gold Medal for meritorious school, culture and art.

== See also ==
- Liceo Classico
