= Consulate-General of the United States, Florence =

Consulate General of the United States Florence Consolato Generale degli Stati Uniti d'America a Firenze
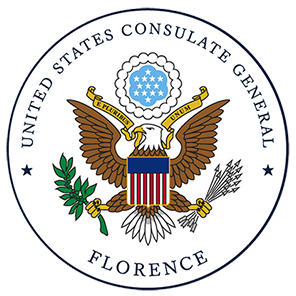
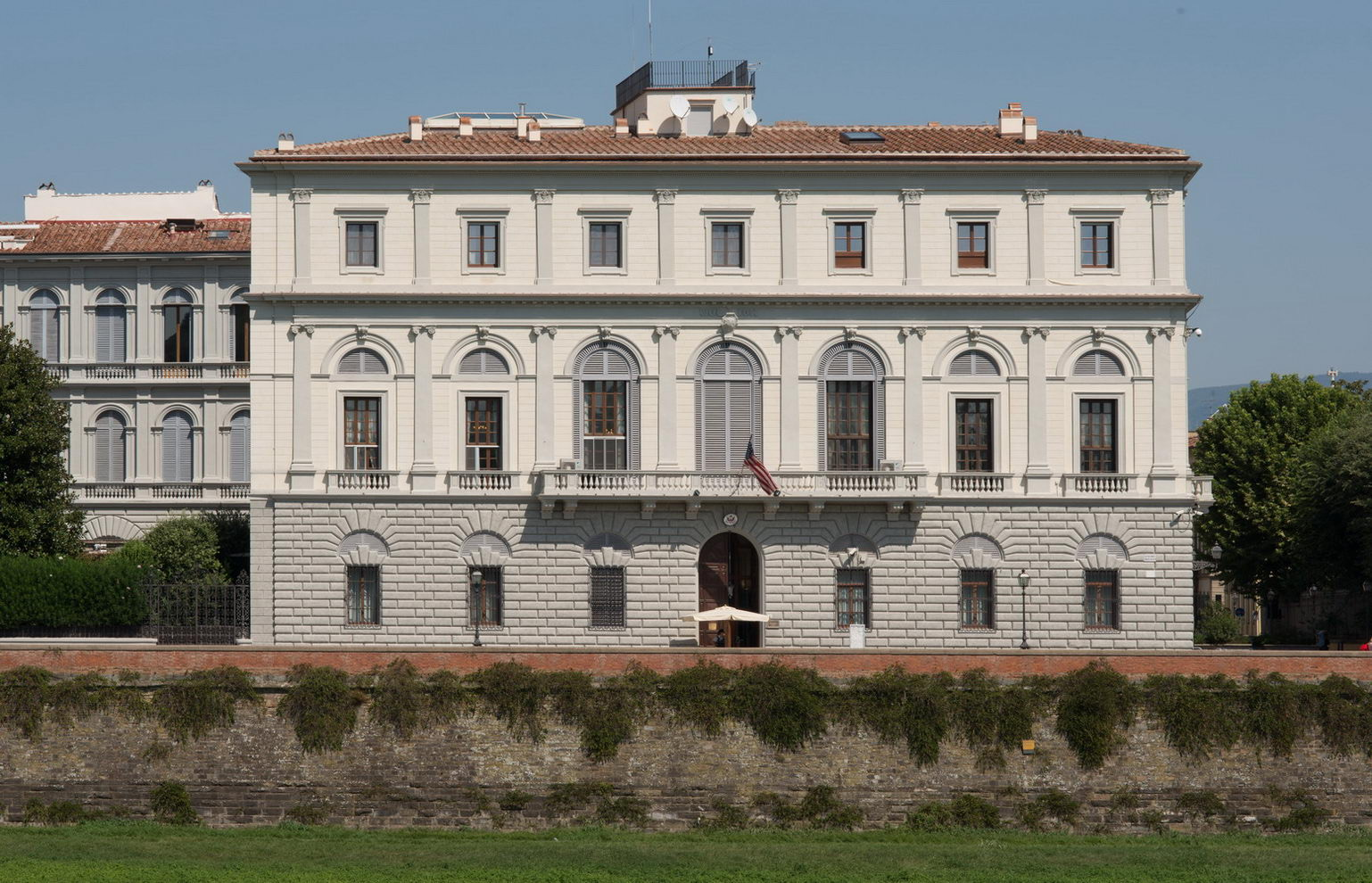
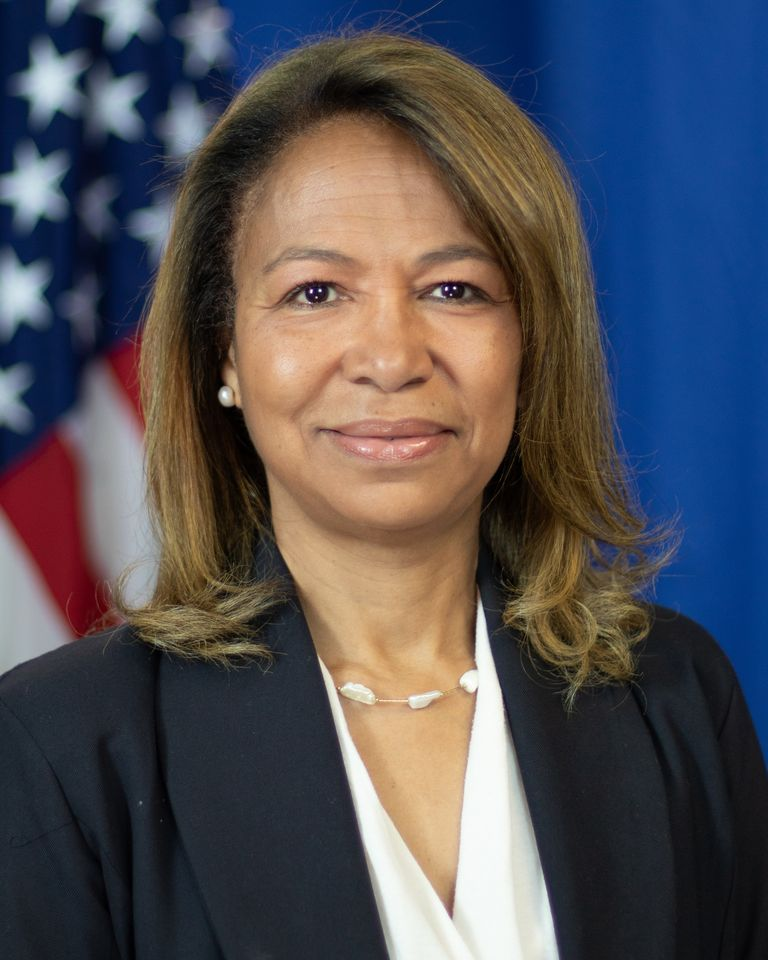
- Seal of the Consulate General of the United States Florence Palazzo Canevaro, residence of the U.S. Consulate Florence Consul General Daniela Ballard
- Address: Lungarno Vespucci 38, Florence
- Opened: 1819
- Jurisdiction: Tuscany; Emilia Romagna (Emilia-Romagna); San Marino
- Consul General: Daniela Ballard
- Website: https://it.usembassy.gov/embassy-consulates/florence/

The Consulate General of the United States in Florence belongs to the U.S. Mission to Italy and represents the interests of the government of the United States in Florence and the surrounding regions of Tuscany and Emilia-Romagna. The U.S. Consul General in Florence also acts as special representative of the United States to the Republic of San Marino. As of 2026, the current U.S. Consul General in Florence is Daniela Ballard.

The Florence Consular District encompasses the regions of Tuscany and Emilia Romagna, with the exception of the two northern-most provinces in Emilia-Romagna (Parma and Piacenza). The 18 provinces have a population of more than six and a half million. Major cities are Florence, Bologna, Pisa, Siena, Lucca, Leghorn, Prato, Arezzo, Modena, Ravenna, Ferrara, Forli’ and Rimini.

In addition, the U.S. Consulate General in Florence serves as the designated consular post for the Republic of San Marino and conducts periodic consular missions in the country.

The American Consulate in Florence is the smallest post in Italy with just 18 staff and three Foreign Service Officers. The Consulate is located in Palazzo Canevaro, a historic building of Lungarno Vespucci.

== History ==
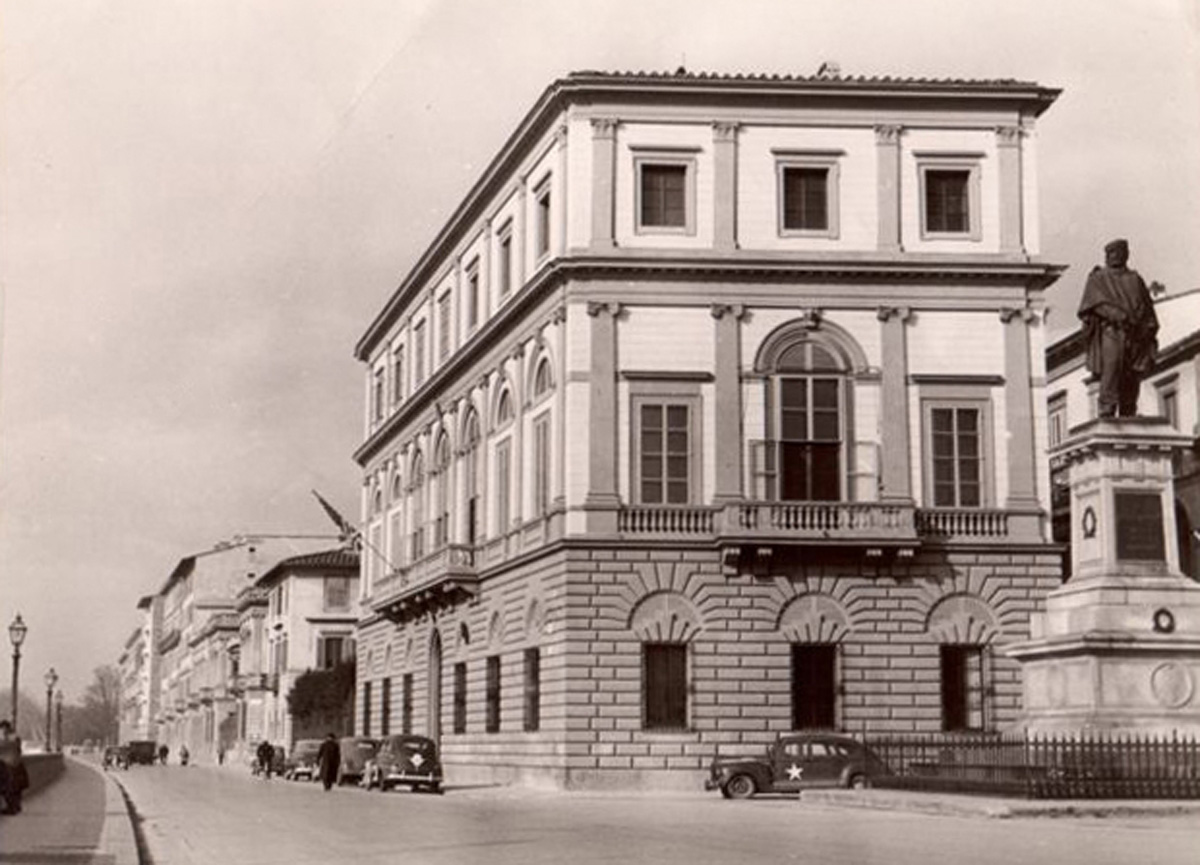
The U.S. Consulate Florence in 1950.

The first Consulate to the Grand Duchy of Tuscany was established in Livorno (then known in English as Leghorn), with consular agent Phillip Felicchi being appointed on 29 May 1794. As Tuscany did not recognize consulates posted in Florence, the first U.S. Consular Agent to serve Florence was Vice Consular Agent James Ombrosi, who was under mandate from the U.S. Consulate at Leghorn (Livorno). Ombrosi was accredited on May 15, 1819.

In March 2025, the second Trump administration announced it may close the U.S. Consulate in Florence, along with other consulates in Italy, France, Germany and Portugal. The President of the Tuscany Region, Eugenio Giani, publicly opposed the proposed closure. In April 2025, Giani announced that he had written a letter to U.S. President Donald Trump and to the U.S. Embassy in Rome. In his letter, President Giani wrote that "In 1819 James Ombrosi took office in Florence as the first consular agent and the first true consul George Perkins Marsh, appointed by President Abraham Lincoln, arrived in 1861. This is one of the most genuine examples of the special relationship that has always been between Tuscany and the United States. Since then, the consulate in Florence has always exercised an important function, including that of issuing visas, which today is exercised only in four American consulates in Italy. I therefore believe that closing the American consulate in Florence would be an inopportune choice that ignores history, the US presence in the region and the welcome that Tuscany has always given to the people of the United States. The Government of Tuscany Region makes a careful appeal for this not to happen: it would be a fatal mistake of history and an element of serious detachment from what has always fueled the relationship between American citizens, the city of Florence and Tuscany. Giorgio Spini, in his book on the history of Florence in the nineteenth century reminds us of when still the "little Florence", which in 1850 had not yet become the capital of Italy, was a city of 100,000 inhabitants and already had 5,000 residents who came from the Anglo-Saxon world, mainly Americans and English. It is evident that there is therefore a structural presence in the relationship between what is the culture expressed by Tuscany and what is today the United States, also formed by a legacy of thought and presence of Tuscan characters, from Amerigo Vespucci to Filippo Mazzei, who have played a fundamental role in past and recent American history. The possible closure of the consulate would be a wrong message addressed to all US citizens who live, work and study in Tuscany and for those who come to visit it."

Florence Mayor Sara Funaro also condemned the proposed closure, defining it as "A reckless decision to the detriment of the many Americans who study and work in Florence, an unmotivated choice that severs a historic relationship with the city. We will make every possible complaint in the appropriate forums. Ours is a city that has always made hospitality a hallmark. There is a strong and consolidated bond with the United States that is rooted in the past. I think of the love for Florence, evidenced in a letter to Mayor Bargellini, written after the 1966 flood of the river Arno, by Jacqueline Kennedy in which she wrote, 'I know that everyone in the world will continue to offer their help, as much as possible and whenever necessary, because the entire world will forever be indebted to Florence.' This decision is a slap in the face to our history, our present, and our future."

The Secretary of State for Foreign Affairs of the Republic of San Marino, Luca Beccari, stated: “We have taken part in discussions with advisors of the central Administration of Washington, who wanted to hear from the various parties involved in interactions with the Consulate; obviously, San Marino has expressed its strong interest in the Consulate remaining open.” He explained that the U.S. Consulate General in Florence is “an important reference point” not only for the administration of the Secretariat of State for Foreign Affairs, but above all for “the many Sammarinese citizens - starting with those who hold dual citizenship - who make use of the services of the Consulate.” Beccari added: “These are services related to passport renewals, or procedures linked to their status as American citizens; for Sammarinese citizens who are not also United States citizens, these are usually applications for long-term entry visas.” He concluded affirming that: “From a logistical point of view, what changes is where consular services are carried out. Obviously, from a substantive point of view, nothing changes in relations with the United States. However, for us - also from the point of view of operational practices, which have now become established with the Florence Consulate - it is clear that it would be important for this to remain.”

The potential closure of the consulate was also opposed by the Italian and American business communities in Tuscany and the Florence Chamber of Commerce. Business leaders noted that the consulate acts as a hub and trade facilitator between Tuscany and the United States. Approximately 250 American companies operate in Tuscany, as of 2025, employing more than forty-five thousand people. According to industry estimates, Tuscany exported more than 9 billion Euros in goods and services to the United States in 2024.

On July 3, 2025, the U.S. Ambassador to Italy, Tilman Fertitta, announced, during Independence Day celebrations in Rome at the presence of Italian Prime Minister Giorgia Meloni and Italian Foreign Minister Antonio Tajani, that the U.S. Consulate General in Florence would remain open and operational. He emphasized the importance of keeping the consulate open, citing the district’s significant American presence: 3.75 million U.S. tourists annually, 18,000 students, 85,000 U.S. citizens residing locally, 200 American companies (in Tuscany alone), and 45,000 people employed by U.S. companies in the area. The presence of U.S. Army Military Base Camp Darby between Pisa and Leghorn, the consular responsibilities for the Republic of San Marino, the operations of major U.S. companies in Florence, such as Baker Hughes and Eli Lilly, and of numerous U.S universities, such as Harvard, Stanford, Syracuse, NYU, Georgetown, also contributed to the decision.

== Sections ==
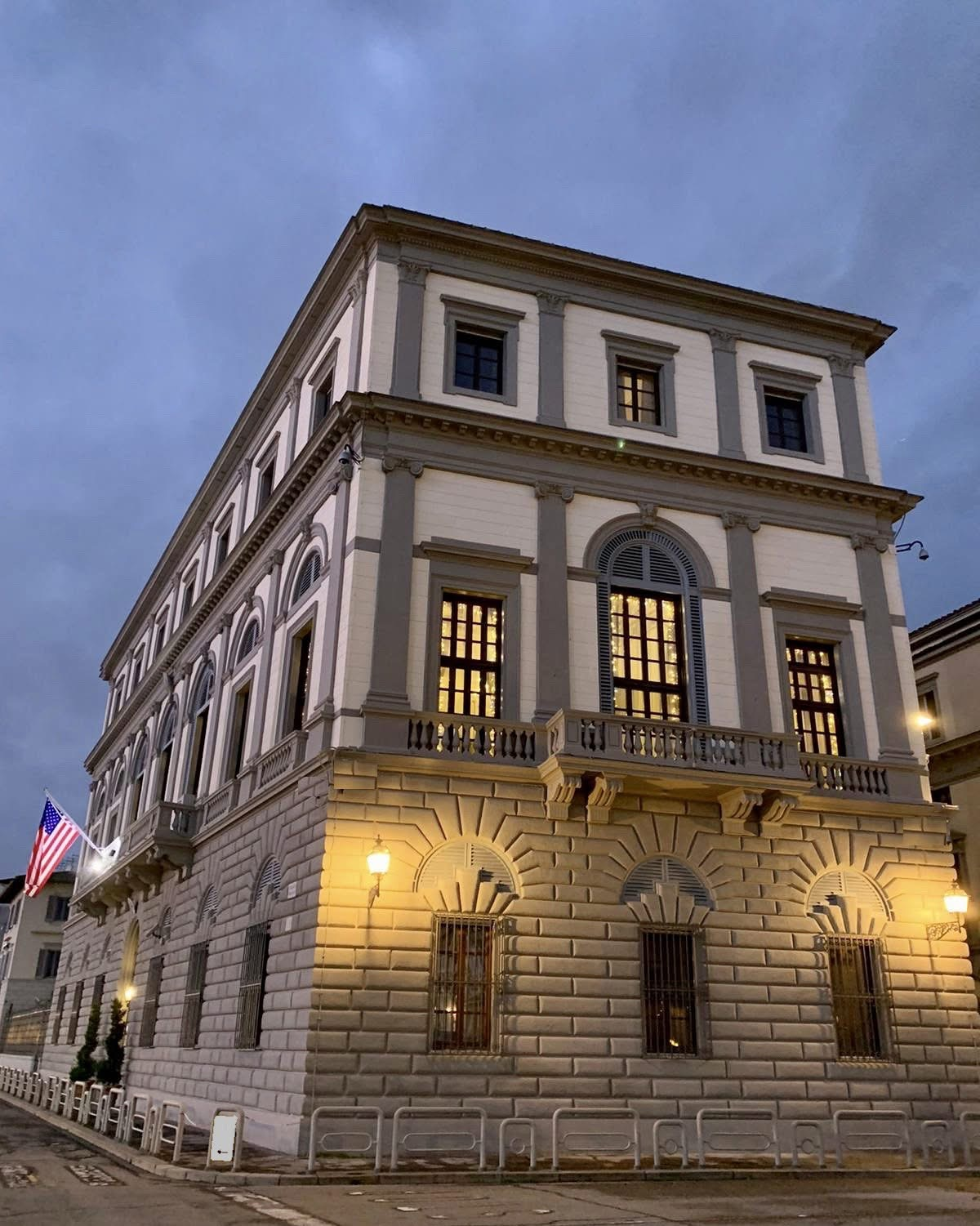
Main entrance of the U.S. Consulate Florence.

The Consular Section is responsible for the welfare and whereabouts of U.S. citizens traveling and residing abroad. Consular Staff also process nonimmigrant visa applications from applicants who do not qualify for the Visa Waiver program.

Apart from consular services, the U.S. Consulate General in Florence hosts a Political-Economic Section, which is responsible for following economic, political, commercial and scientific/environmental developments in central Italy and the Republic of San Marino. The Section also assists in the promotion of American business and trade in the region.

In addition, the Section provides official information about U.S. government decisions and policies to the government of San Marino and to regional and local authorities in the Consular district.
