= Embassy of the United States, Rome =

Diplomatic mission of the United States to Italy

Embassy of the United States, Rome Ambasciata degli Stati Uniti d'America a Roma
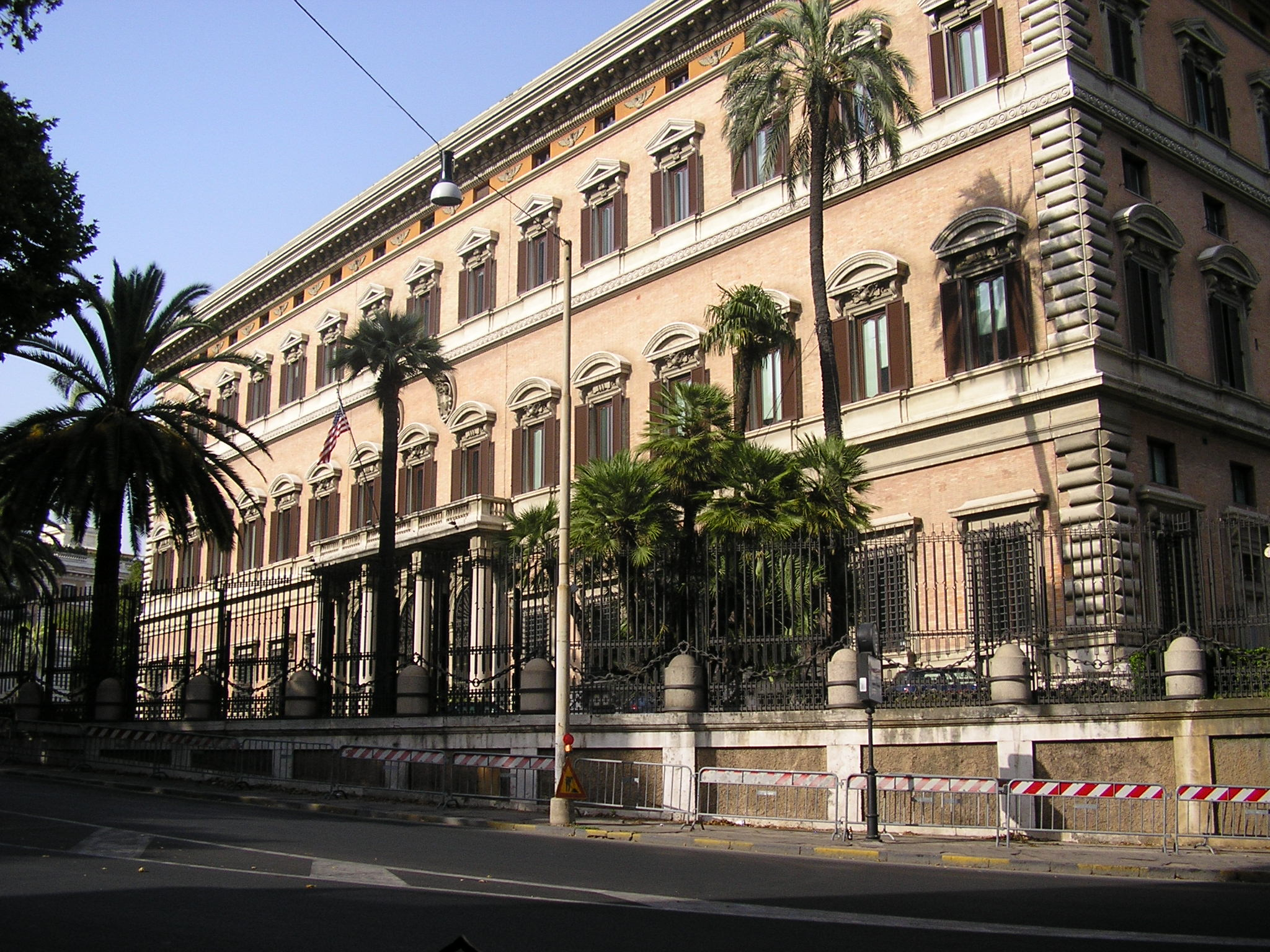
- Address: Palazzo Margherita, Via Veneto; Rome, Italy
- Coordinates: 41°54′24″N 12°29′27″E
- Opened: 1946; 80 years ago
- Ambassador: Tilman Fertitta
- Website: Official website

The Embassy of the United States of America in Rome is the diplomatic mission of the United States of America to the Italian Republic. The embassy's chancery is situated in the Palazzo Margherita, Via Vittorio Veneto, Rome. The United States also maintains consulates general in Milan, Florence and Naples, and consular agencies in Genoa, Palermo, and Venice. The diplomatic mission comprises several sections and offices, such as the public affairs section and its cultural office. The current United States Ambassador to Italy is businessman Tilman Fertitta.

Two other American diplomatic missions are located in Rome. The Embassy of the United States to the Holy See, previously located on Aventine Hill, moved to new headquarters in September 2015 in a separate building on the same compound as the United States Embassy Rome, while the United States Mission to the UN Agencies in Rome is located in a third building on the same compound since December 2011, when they moved from their former location at Piazza del Popolo.

== Terrorism ==
On June 10, 1987, a rocket attack hit the embassy. However, no one was hurt. Junzo Okudaira, a member of the Japanese Red Army, was suspected to have carried out the attack.

== See also ==
- Embassy of Italy, Washington, D.C.
- Italy–United States relations
