= Nathaniel Niles Jr. =

American physician and diplomat

Nathaniel Niles Jr. (1791–1869) was an American medical doctor and diplomat. A graduate of Harvard Medical School, he served as special diplomatic agent in Austria-Hungary and as chargé d’affaires to the Kingdom of Sardinia.
