= Italy–United States relations =

- Italy: United States

Diplomatic mission
- Italian Embassy, Washington, D.C.: United States Embassy, Rome

Envoy
- Ambassador Marco Peronaci: Ambassador Tilman J. Fertitta

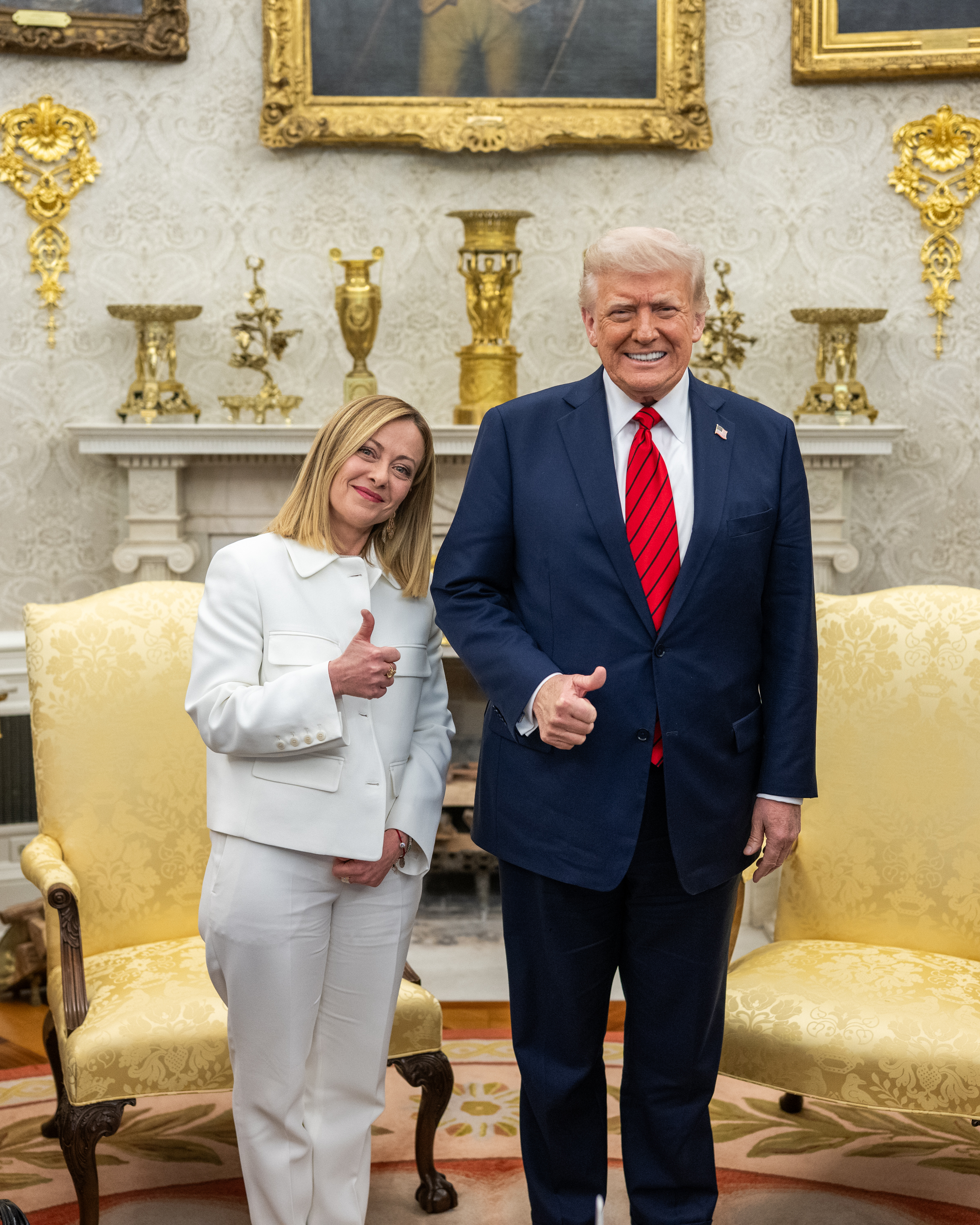
Italian Prime Minister Giorgia Meloni with U.S. President Donald Trump in the Oval Office of the White House on 17 April 2025

Italy and the United States enjoy friendly relations. The United States has had diplomatic representation in the nation of Italy and its predecessor nations, the Kingdom of Sardinia and then the Kingdom of Italy, since 1840. However, in 1891 the Italian government severed diplomatic relations and briefly contemplated war against the US as a response to the unresolved case of the lynching of eleven Italians in New Orleans, Louisiana, and there was a break in relations from 1941 to 1943, while Italy and the United States were at war.

After World War II, Italy became a strong and active transatlantic partner which, along with the United States, has sought to foster democratic ideals and international cooperation in areas of strife and civil conflict. Toward this end, the Italian government has cooperated with the United States in the formulation of defense, security, and peacekeeping policies. Under longstanding bilateral agreements flowing from NATO membership, Italy hosts important U.S. military forces at Vicenza and Livorno (army); Aviano (air force); and Sigonella, Gaeta, and Naples—home port for the U.S. Navy Sixth Fleet. The United States has about 11,500 military personnel stationed in Italy. Italy hosts the NATO Defense College in Rome.

== History ==
=== 18th, 19th, and early 20th Century ===
Before 1861, no singular Italian nation state existed. The Italian Peninsula was instead divided among several smaller states, each of which the United States established diplomatic relations with. Many of these smaller Italian states were among the first countries in the world to recognize the independence of and maintain diplomatic relations with the United States. For example, the Republic of Genoa officially recognized U.S. independence in 1792 and consular relations were established with the Papal States in 1797. During the Risorgimento, the smaller states inhabiting the Italian Peninsula unified to form the Kingdom of Italy. The United States officially recognized the Kingdom of Italy on April 11, 1861.

During the First Barbary War (1801–1805), the United States was allied with the Kingdom of Sicily against the Barbary corsairs due to a shared interest by both countries in putting an end to the disruption of trade on the Mediterranean Sea caused by the corsairs.

Both Italy and the United States were part of the Eight-Nation Alliance that intervened in the Boxer Rebellion in China from 1899 to 1901.

From the 1880s to 1920, more than 4 million Italians emigrated to the United States and accounted for more than 10 percent of the country's foreign-born population. Italian Americans faced rampant hostility and discrimination. Italian immigration to the United States dramatically declined tapered off in the 1920s largely because of passage of the Immigration Act of 1924.

After the deaths of 11 Italians during a mass lynching in 1891, relations between the nations were strained. The Italian government demanded that the lynch mob be brought to justice and reparations be paid to the dead men's families. When the U.S. declined to prosecute the mob leaders, Italy recalled its ambassador from Washington in protest. The U.S. followed suit, recalling its delegation from Rome. Diplomatic relations remained at an impasse for over a year. When President Benjamin Harrison agreed to pay a $25,000 indemnity to the victims' families, Congress tried unsuccessfully to intervene, accusing him of "unconstitutional executive usurpation of Congressional powers".

=== The rise of fascism and World War II ===
The United States and Italy were both members of the Allied Powers during World War I, and President Woodrow Wilson visited Rome while traveling to the Paris Peace Conference. However, at the Conference President Woodrow Wilson opposed Italian irredentist war aims guaranteed in the secret Treaty of London, which ran counter to his 14 Points demanding "open diplomacy" and self-determination. In protest of Wilson and the other Allied leaders' refusal to recognize territorial demands in Yugoslavia and Albania, the Italian delegation under Prime Minister Vittorio Orlando and Foreign Minister Sidney Sonnino walked out of the conference. Wilson tried to mollify the situation by issuing a direct appeal to the Italian people in Le Temps, but it was widely derided by the Italian public.

Since Mussolini's rise to power, the United States applauded him on his early achievements, including helping with relations between the two countries. Relations deteriorated after Italy invaded Ethiopia in 1935.

On December 11, 1941, four days after the Japanese attacked Pearl Harbor in December 1941, Germany and Italy declared war on the United States, and the U.S. reciprocated in kind. The U.S. and Britain seized Sicily in 1943 with little combat needed as the Italians pulled out. The Allied invasion of Southern Italy in fall 1943 was a different matter, however, as casualties were high and progress was slow. The Allies captured Rome in June 1944 and very slowly pushed north. The Allies gave much higher priority to the invasion of France in 1944; Italy was a "backwater.".

From 1943 till the end of the war the only part of Italy at war with the United States was the German puppet state the Italian Social Republic. Italian Partisans and Victor Emmanuel III and his loyalists from 1943 overthrew Mussolini and declared war on Germany. Germany quickly overran the entire peninsula. Italy helped the United States and other Allies during the Italian Campaign of World War II.

=== 1946–1989 ===
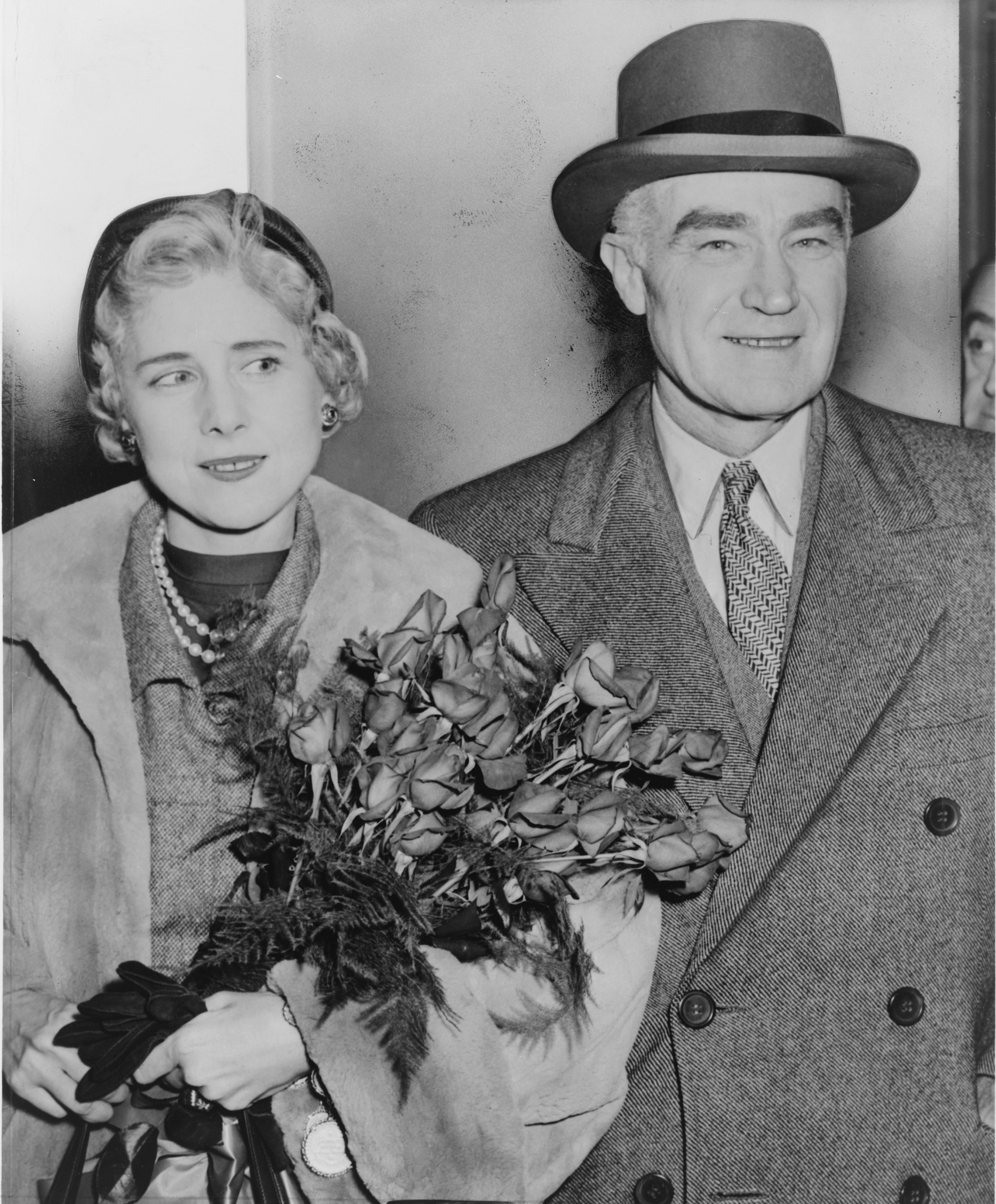
Clare Boothe Luce, U.S. Ambassador to Italy, with husband Henry Luce (1954)

When the war ended in May 1945, the United States occupied Italy until its plebiscite on the institutional form of the State. The United States helped with the transition from a monarchy to a republic in 1946. Italy had become a valued ally of the United States against the spread of communism in Europe during the Cold War .

Italy signed a Peace Treaty with the U.S. and Britain in 1947 and joined the North Atlantic Treaty Organization (NATO) in 1949. The U.S. helped to revive the Italian economy through the Marshall Plan. In the same years, Italy also became a member of the European Coal and Steel Community (ECSC), which eventually transformed into the European Union (EU).

Christian Democrat Prime Minister Alcide De Gasperi (1945–1953) enjoyed considerable support in the US, where he was seen as the man who could oppose the rising tide of Communism – in particular the Italian Communist Party, which was the biggest communist party in a Western European democracy. In January 1947 he visited the US. The chief goals of the trip were to soften the terms of the pending peace treaty with Italy, and to obtain immediate economic assistance. His ten-day tour, engineered by media mogul Henry Luce – the owner of Time Magazine – and his wife Clare Boothe Luce the future ambassador to Rome, was viewed as a media "triumph," prompting positive comments of a wide section of the American press.

During his meetings in the U.S., he managed to secure a financially modest but politically significant US$100 million Eximbank loan to Italy. According to De Gasperi, public opinion would view the loan as a vote of confidence in the Italian Government and strengthen his position versus the Communist Party in the context of the emerging Cold War. The positive results strengthened De Gasperi's reputation in Italy. He also came back with useful information on the incipient change in American foreign policy that would lead to the Cold War and in Italy the break with the Communists and left-wing Socialists and their removal from the government in the May 1947 crisis.

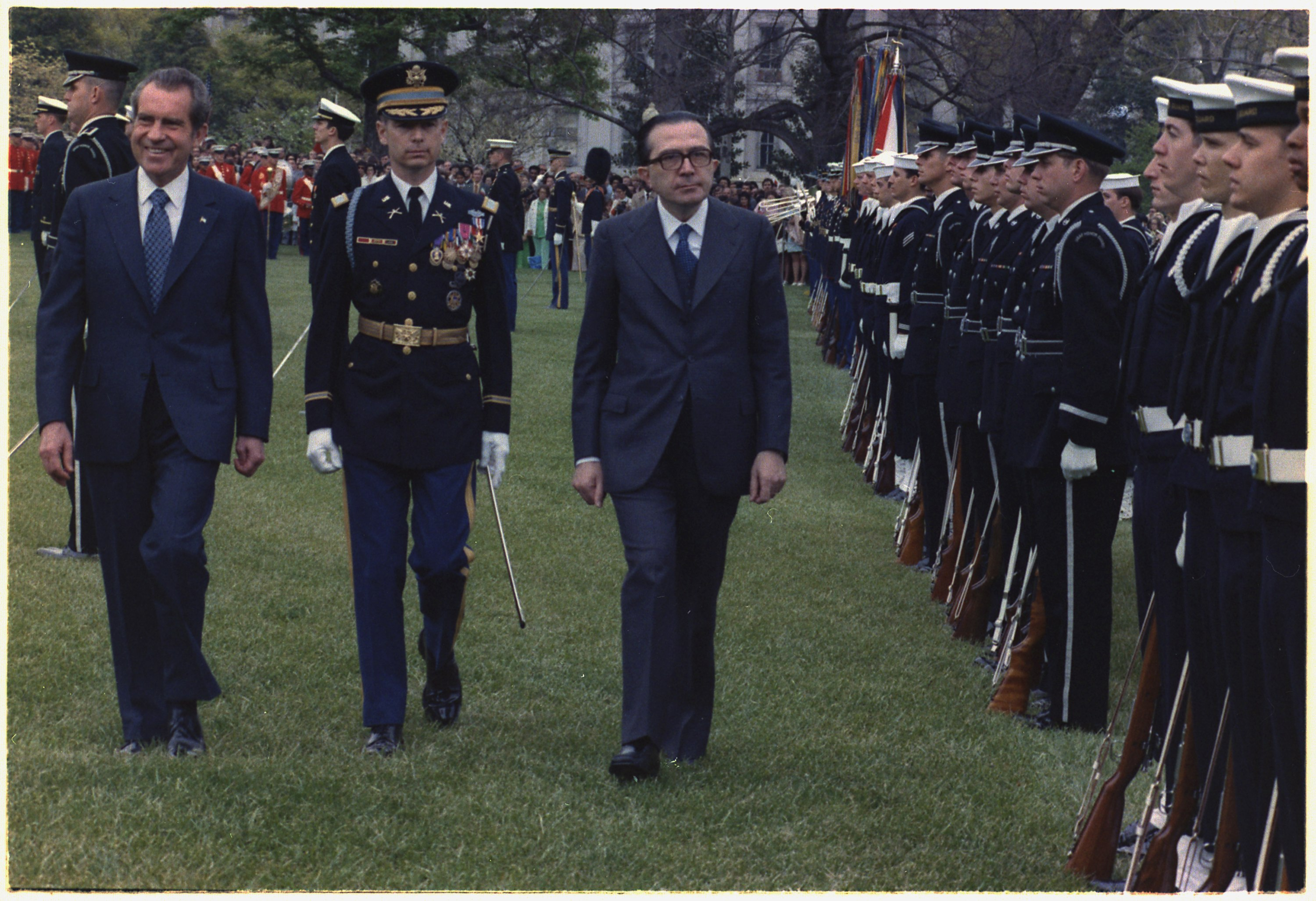
Prime Minister Giulio Andreotti with President Richard Nixon in 1973

Italy faced political instability in the 1970s, which ended in the 1980s. Known as the Years of Lead, this period was characterized by widespread social conflicts and terrorist acts carried out by extra-parliamentary movements. The assassination of the leader of the Christian Democracy (DC), Aldo Moro, led to the end of a "historic compromise" between the DC and the Communist Party (PCI). In the 1980s, for the first time, two governments were managed by a republican (Giovanni Spadolini) and a socialist (Bettino Craxi) rather than by a member of DC.

Many aspects of the Years of Lead are still shrouded in mystery and debate about them continues. There were many, especially on the left, who spoke of the existence in those years of a strategy of tension (strategia della tensione). According to this theory, occult and foreign forces were involved in creating a "strategy of tension". Identified organizations included: Gladio, a NATO secret anti-communist structure; the P2 masonic lodge, discovered in 1981 following the arrest of its leader Licio Gelli; neo-fascist "black terrorism" organizations such as Ordine Nuovo or Avanguardia Nazionale; Italian secret service; and the United States. This theory re-emerged in the 1990s, following Prime Minister Giulio Andreotti's recognition of the existence of Gladio before the Parliamentary assembly on 24 October 1990. Juridical investigations into the Piazza Fontana bombing and the Bologna massacre and several parliamentary reports pointed towards such a deliberate strategy of tension. Milan prosecutor Guido Salvini indicted a U.S. Navy officer, David Carrett, for his role in the Piazza Fontana bombing. He also surprised Carlo Rocchi, a CIA operative in Italy, in 1995 while searching for information concerning the case in the mid-1990s. In 2000, a Parliamentary Commission report from the then center-left government, concluded that the strategy of tension had been supported by the United States to "stop the PCI, and to a certain degree also the PSI, from reaching executive power in the country".

In 1985, disagreement over the handling of the Achille Lauro hijacking resulted in a heated diplomatic clash between the Italian and United States governments, as well as between elements of their respective militaries. The diplomatic quarrel, known as the Sigonella crisis, escalated into a confrontation and arm standoff between United States special forces units and the Italian military, primarily the VAM (Vigilanza Aeronautica Militare) and Carabinieri. The diplomatic crisis was soon resolved during a conference between Prime Minister Bettino Craxi and President Ronald Reagan.

With the end of the Years of lead (Italy) (1969–1989), the Italian Communist Party gradually increased its votes under the leadership of Enrico Berlinguer. The Socialist party (PSI), partner of Christian Democrats and led by Prime Minister Bettino Craxi, became more and more critical of the communists and of the Soviet Union; Craxi himself pushed in favour of US president Ronald Reagan's positioning of Pershing II missiles in Italy, a move the communists hotly contested. After the fall of the Berlin Wall, Italy faced significant challenges, as voters, disenchanted with past political paralysis, massive government debt and an extensive corruption system (collectively called Tangentopoli after being uncovered by the 'Clean Hands' investigation ), demanded political, economic, and ethical reforms. The scandals involved all major parties, but especially those in the government coalition: between 1992 and 1994 the Christian Democrats underwent a severe crisis and was dissolved, splitting up into several pieces, while also the Socialists and the other governing minor parties also dissolved. The Communists reorganized as a social-democratic force.

=== 1989–2008 ===
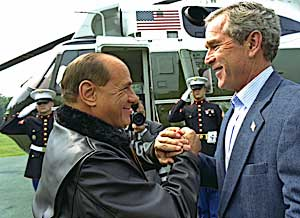
Prime Minister Silvio Berlusconi and President George W. Bush in 2002

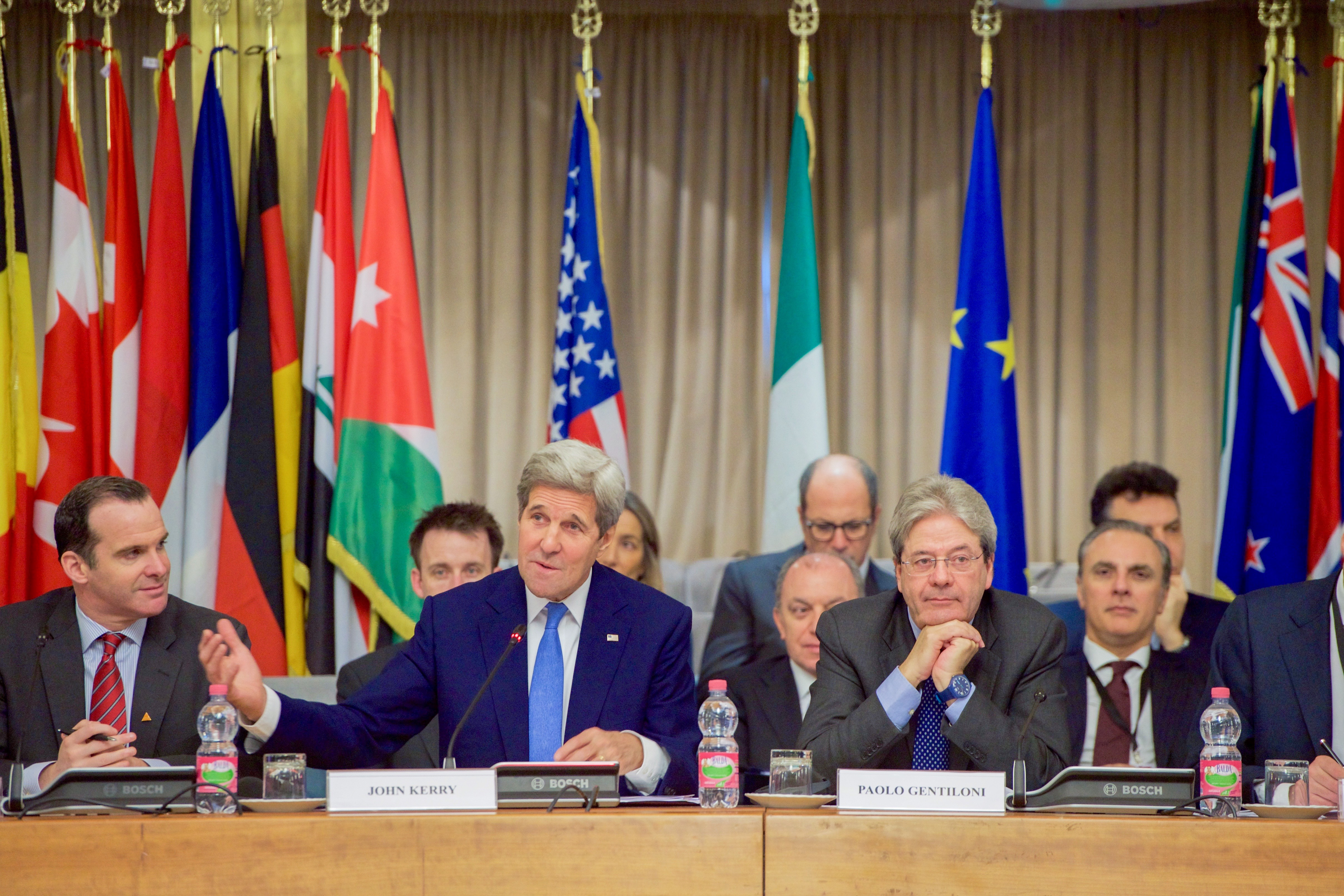
U.S. Secretary of State John Kerry and Italian Foreign Minister Paolo Gentiloni, February 2016

During the 1990s and 2000s, the United States and Italy have always cooperated as NATO partners on issues like the Gulf War, Lebanon, the Middle East peace process, multilateral talks, Somalia and Mozambique peacekeeping, drug trafficking, trafficking in women and children, and terrorism. Under longstanding bilateral agreements flowing from NATO membership, Italy hosts important U.S. military forces at Vicenza and Livorno (army); Aviano (air force); and Sigonella, Gaeta, and Naples–home port for the United States Sixth Fleet. The United States has about 13,000 military personnel stationed in Italy. Italy hosts the NATO Defence College in Rome. Italy remains a strong and active transatlantic partner which, along with the United States, has sought to foster democratic ideals and international cooperation in areas of strife and civil conflict.

Relations between the two nations were briefly but significantly strained in the wake of the 1998 Cavalese cable car crash. Near the Italian ski resort town of Cavalese in the Dolomites, a United States Marine Corps EA-6B Prowler aircraft, flying too low and against regulations, cut a cable supporting a cable car of an aerial lift, causing the car to plummet over 80 metres (260 ft) to the ground and killing 20 people. The pilot and navigator of the aircraft were put on trial in the United States and found not guilty of involuntary manslaughter and negligent homicide, outraging the Italian public.

During the 2000s, Berlusconi and his cabinets have had a strong tendency to support American foreign policies, despite the policy divide between the U.S. and many founding members of the European Union (Germany, France, and Belgium) during the Bush administration. Under his lead the Italian Government also shifted its traditional position on foreign policy from being the most pro-Arab western government towards a greater friendship with Israel and Turkey. Italy, with Berlusconi in office, became a solid ally of the United States due to his support in the War in Afghanistan and the Iraq War following the 2003 invasion of Iraq in the war on terror. Silvio Berlusconi, in his meetings with United Nations Secretary-General Kofi Annan and U.S. President George W. Bush, said that he pushed for "a clear turnaround in the Iraqi situation" and for a quick handover of sovereignty to the government chosen by the Iraqi people. The Italian Armed Forces had some 3,200 troops deployed in Southern Iraq, the third largest contingent there after the American and British forces. Italian troops were gradually withdrawn from Iraq in the second half of 2006 with the last soldiers leaving the country in December of the same year.

During his second center-left government from 2006 to 2008, Prime Minister Romano Prodi laid out some sense of his new foreign policy when he pledged to withdraw Italian troops from Iraq and called the Iraq War a "grave mistake that has not solved but increased the problem of security".

=== 2026 ===
Italian Prime Minister Giorgia Meloni and U.S. President Donald Trump had a strong relationship, which included Meloni being the only European leader to attend Trump's second inauguration and being labelled "Europe's Trump whisperer".

At the beginning of the 2026 Iran War, Italy intervened to defend Cyprus by sending the Italian Navy's missile frigate Federico Martinengo and remained to defend the central Mediterranean. At the end of March, some military planes carrying weapons for the Iran war had been due to land at the Sigonella Air Base in Sicily, before heading to the Middle East. The use of the base had been denied because the U.S. sought authorisation to land only while the aircraft were airborne and there was not enough time to seek approval in parliament, as is required for such planes. According to treaties established in the late 1950s, American bases can be used for logistical and training purposes but not as transit hubs for aircraft used to transport weapons for war, unless in an emergency situation. In the same days, Meloni condemned Trump's criticism of Pope Leo XIV, which included Trump posting on social media an image of himself as being a Jesus-like figure. Trump was irritated by the Italian response and attacked Meloni in an interview to Corriere della Sera and on Fox Business in April. As the Iran war continued, Italy strengthened the defense of the Gulf of Aden for the safe passage of merchant ships. In the midst of the war against Iran, the United States requested naval support, particularly minesweepers, from NATO allies and Italy offered its support, but only within the framework of cooperation to reopen the Strait of Hormuz, and only after the war was over. Two Italian minesweepers, the Rimini and the Crotone, set sail for the Persian Gulf as part of Operation Aspides.

She is happy that I talked to her. I didn't have to talk to her. She wanted my picture so badly. [...] She asked me... She begged for a picture. I wouldn't have done it, but I felt sorry for her.

— Donald Trump, 19 June 2026

On June 19, after the G7 Summit, U.S. President Donald Trump claimed in an interview to La7 that Meloni begged him for a picture and that he "felt sorry for her". Meloni posted a video on social media in which she said that Trump's statements were fabricated and that "it's a shame that he doesn't show the same determination with the enemies of the West [...] leaderships towards which he appears much more accommodating". (Note: Original statement in Italian: Dunque certe cose meritano una risposta immediata. Le dichiarazioni di Donald Trump sono dichiarazioni totalmente inventate. Sono francamente allibita. Non so perchè il Presidente degli Stati Uniti si comporti così con i propri alleati. Non è, del resto, la prima volta che accade. Posso solo dire che dispiace che non abbia la stessa determinazione con i nemici dell'Occidente, con i nemici degli Stati Uniti, con leadership con le quali, invece, si dimostra molto più accondiscendente. Però una cosa se la deve ricordare: io e l'Italia non imploriamo mai.) Trump wrote a post on Truth Social reiterating his version and explaining that "[Meloni] is doing poorly in Italy with her level of popularity, possibly because she turned down the United States of America [...] She wouldn't even let us use Italy's landing strips or runways [...] Now, after the United States defeated Iran militarily, she wants to be friends again in order to get her numbers up". Meloni replied on Instagram, defining his attacks as "senseless", making clear that she respected the agreements and defended national interest when she denied the use of American military bases in Italy, and finally suggesting him to focus on his own popularity. In response to Trump's remarks, Italy's Foreign Minister Antonio Tajani and President of Lombardy Attilio Fontana canceled a planned visit to the United States. President of Italy, Sergio Mattarella, called Giorgia Meloni to express solidarity, while President of France Emmanuel Macron expressed surprise to the press. Tajani also defined Trump's messages as "incomprehensible". On the 21st, Trump wrote on Truth Social that Italy and Meloni didn't want to defend the United States becoming involved with Iran, and that this was "not good". In a subsequent interview to Tgcom24, Trump said that he was disappointed by Italy and by all NATO leaders, and during a signing event in the Oval Office he said that "Italy was very bad" when referring to the Iran war. Interviewed about Trump's statements, Mark Rutte stressed that Italy respected the agreements with the U.S. and that hundreds of planes took off from its bases for logistics or technical assistance. Ambassador Tilman Fertitta commented that Italy always respected the agreements.

Meloni wanted to restore the relationship with the United States to normality. The clash with Trump was discussed during the Council of Ministers meeting, where Meloni emphasized that it must not affect the government's relations with the U.S. and invited the ministers to attend the July 2nd celebrations at the U.S. Embassy for the Independence Day. Following the NATO summit in Ankara, Turkey, relations between the United States and Italy normalized, thanks in part to Italy's response to US requests for a greater contribution to NATO military spending. Italy will gradually increase its military spending from 2.8% to 3.4% of its GDP. However, this spending will be primarily allocated to the national defense industry and will be conducted in accordance with the principles of financial sustainability.

== Cultural relations ==
=== Cuisine ===
Pizza is a major Italian cuisine export to the United States

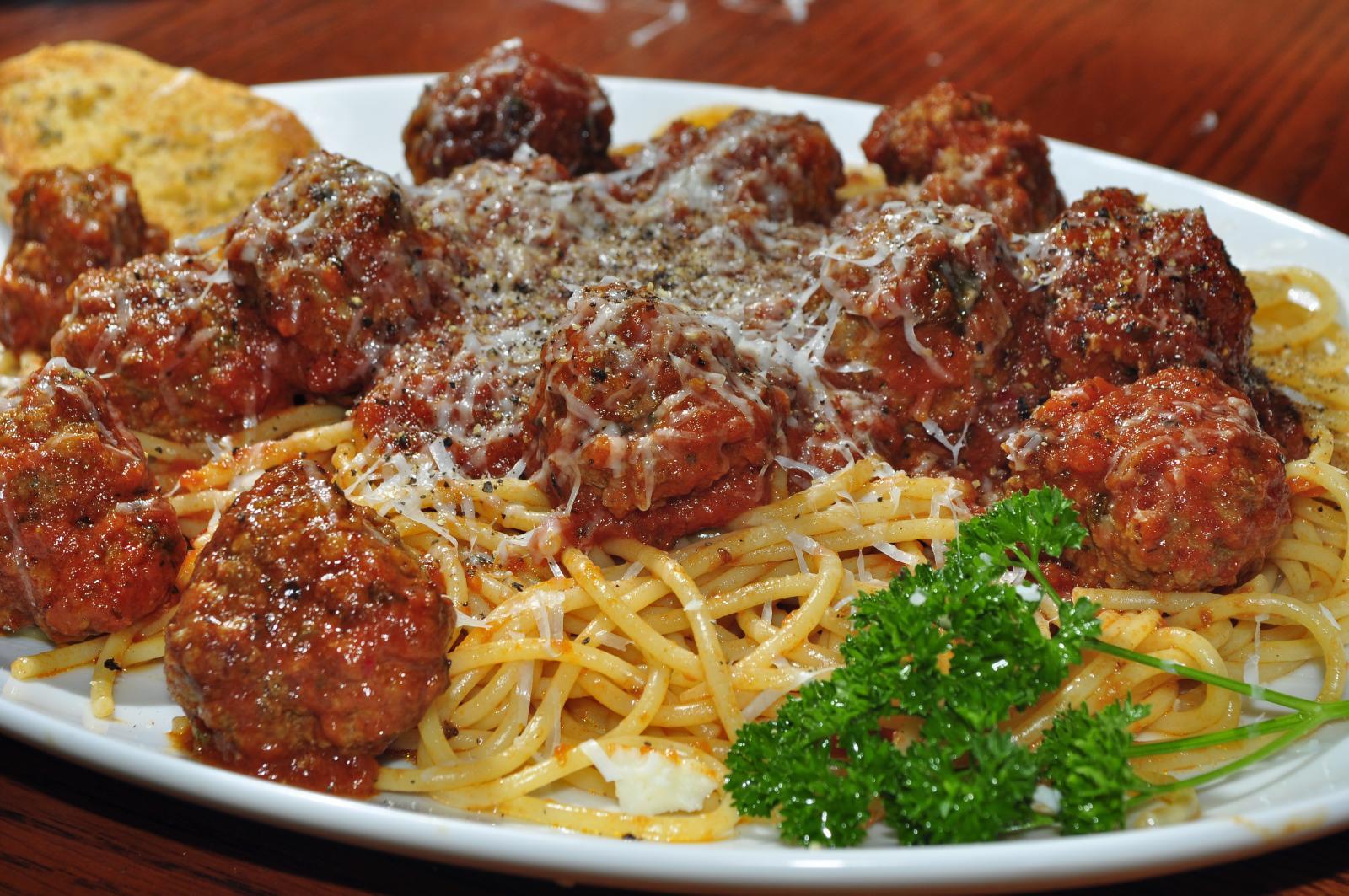
Spaghetti and meatballs

Italian-American cuisine (Italian: cucina italoamericana) is a style of Italian cuisine adapted throughout the United States. Italian-American cuisine was created primarily by Italian immigrants, and the cuisine has been shaped throughout the years by various waves of immigrants and their descendants, called Italian Americans.

=== Sports ===
Baseball is popular in Nettuno, Italy because of the legacy of American soldiers residing there during World War II. The town has won several European championships and has helped to spread the sport into the rest of Italy.

== Public opinion ==
According to Pew Research opinion polls, 70% of Italians viewed the United States favorably in 2012, increasing to 78% in 2014. According to the 2012 U.S. Global Leadership Report by Gallup, 51% of Italians approved of U.S. leadership under the Obama Administration, with 16% disapproving and 33% uncertain. On the other hand, according to the Best Countries survey by U.S. News & World Report, Italy is among Americans' favorite countries, ranking fourth overall in 2024. According to a 2026 Pew Research Center survey, 31% of Italians had a favorable view of the United States, while 69% had a negative view.

== Resident diplomatic missions ==
- Italy has an embassy in Washington, D.C., and consulates-general in Boston, Chicago, Houston, Los Angeles, Miami, New York City, Philadelphia and San Francisco and a consulate in Detroit.
- United States has an embassy in Rome and Consulates General in Florence, Milan and Naples.
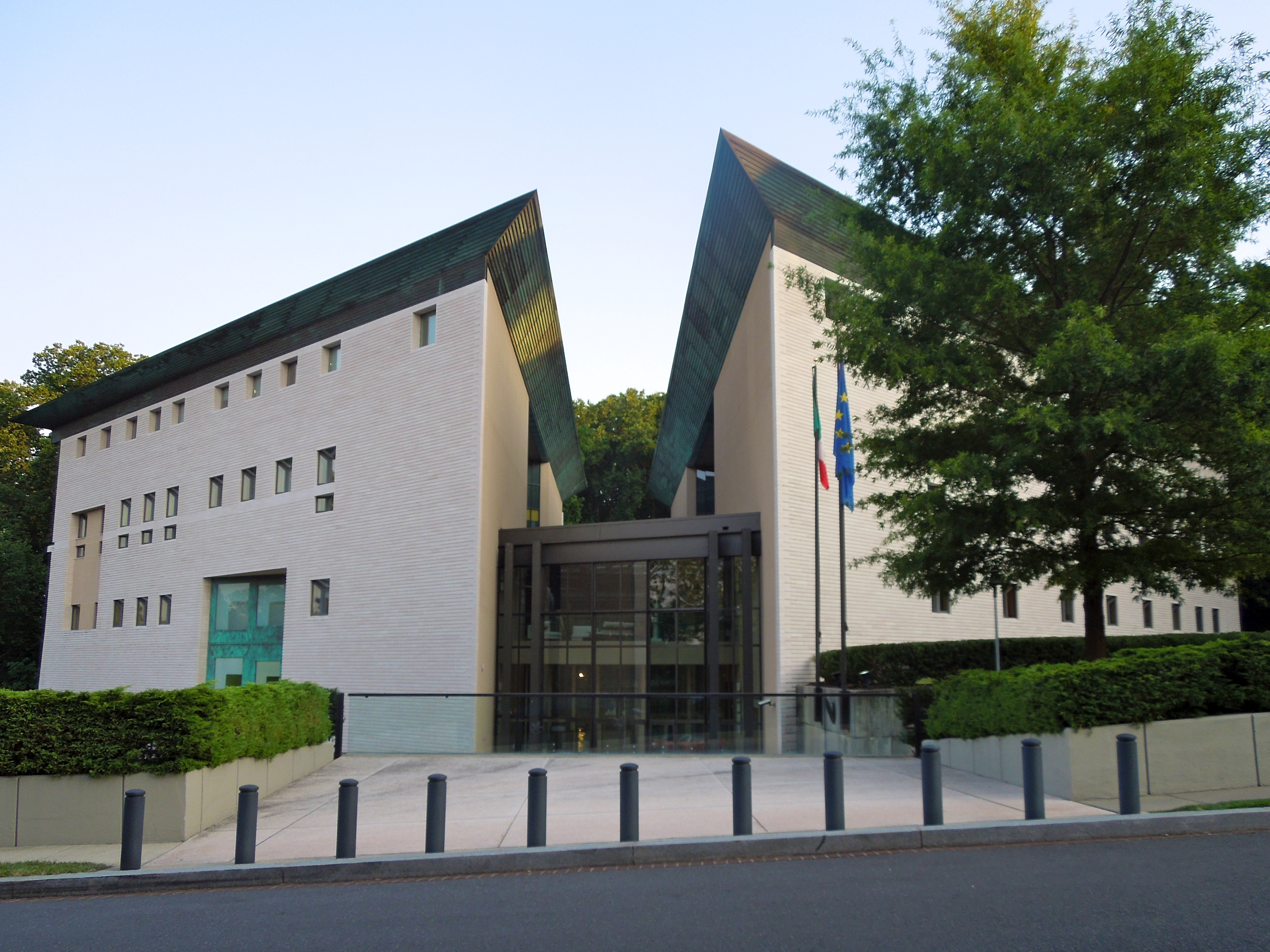
Embassy of Italy in Washington, D.C.

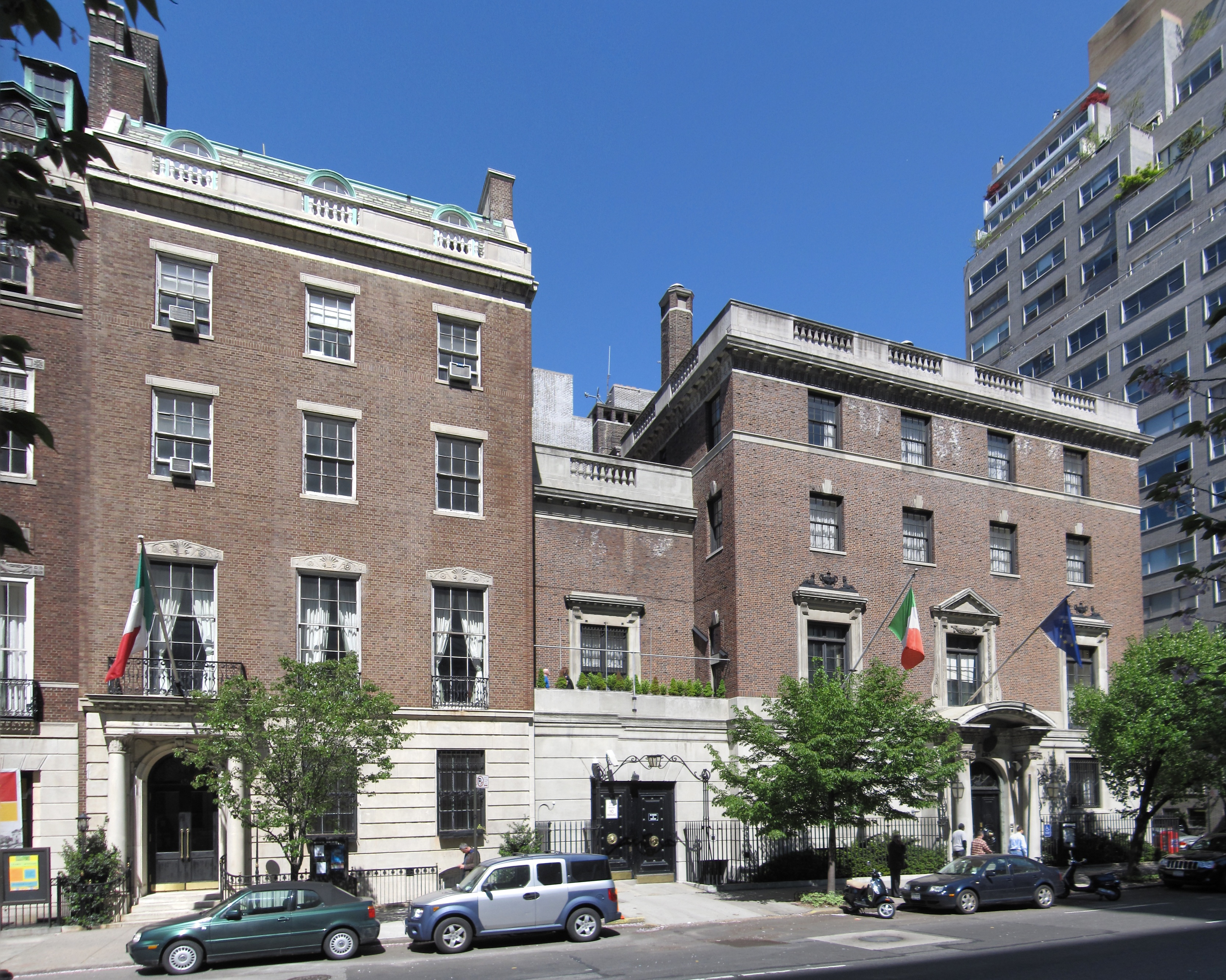
Consulate-General of Italy in New York City

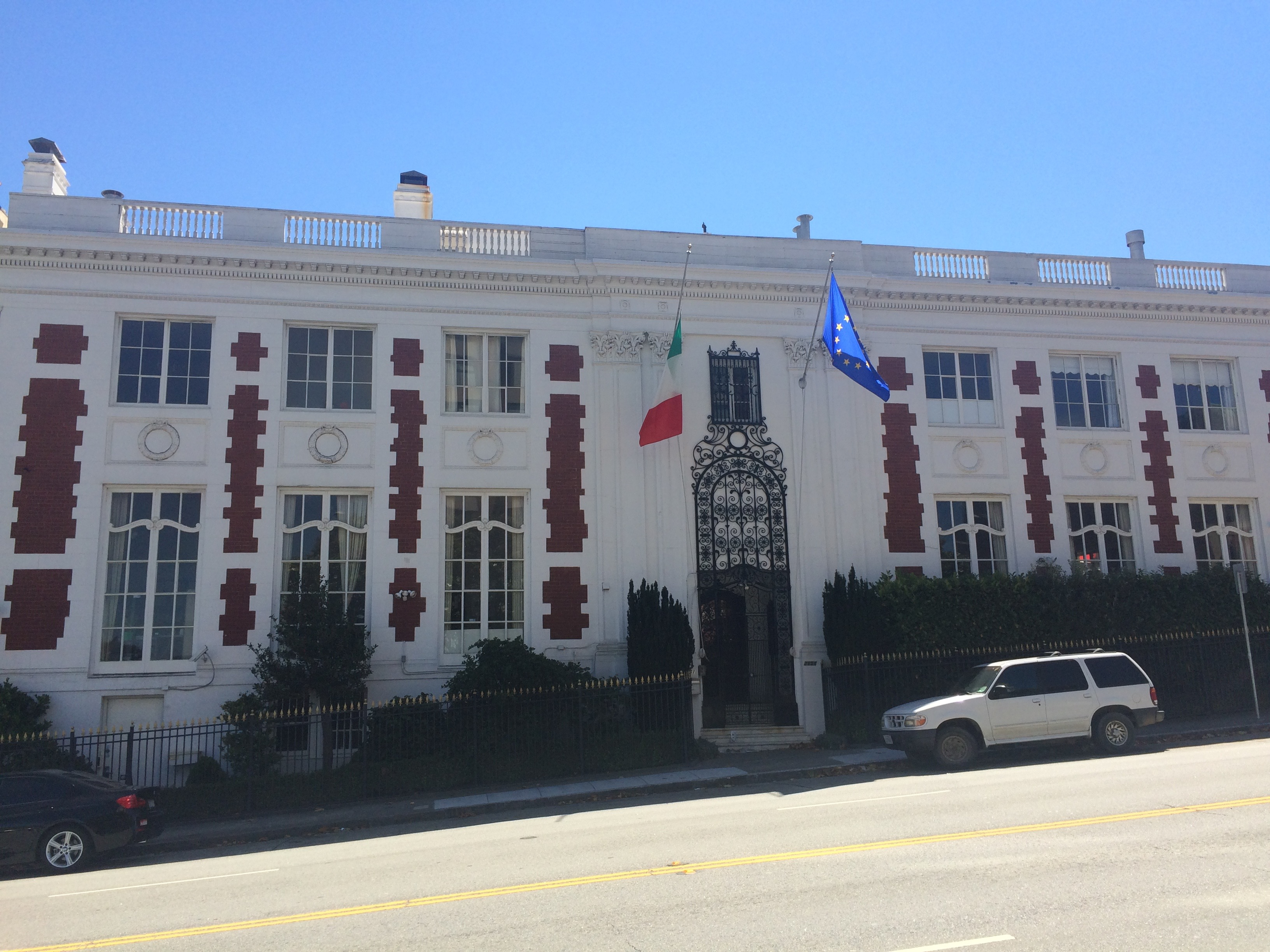
Consulate-General of Italy in San Francisco
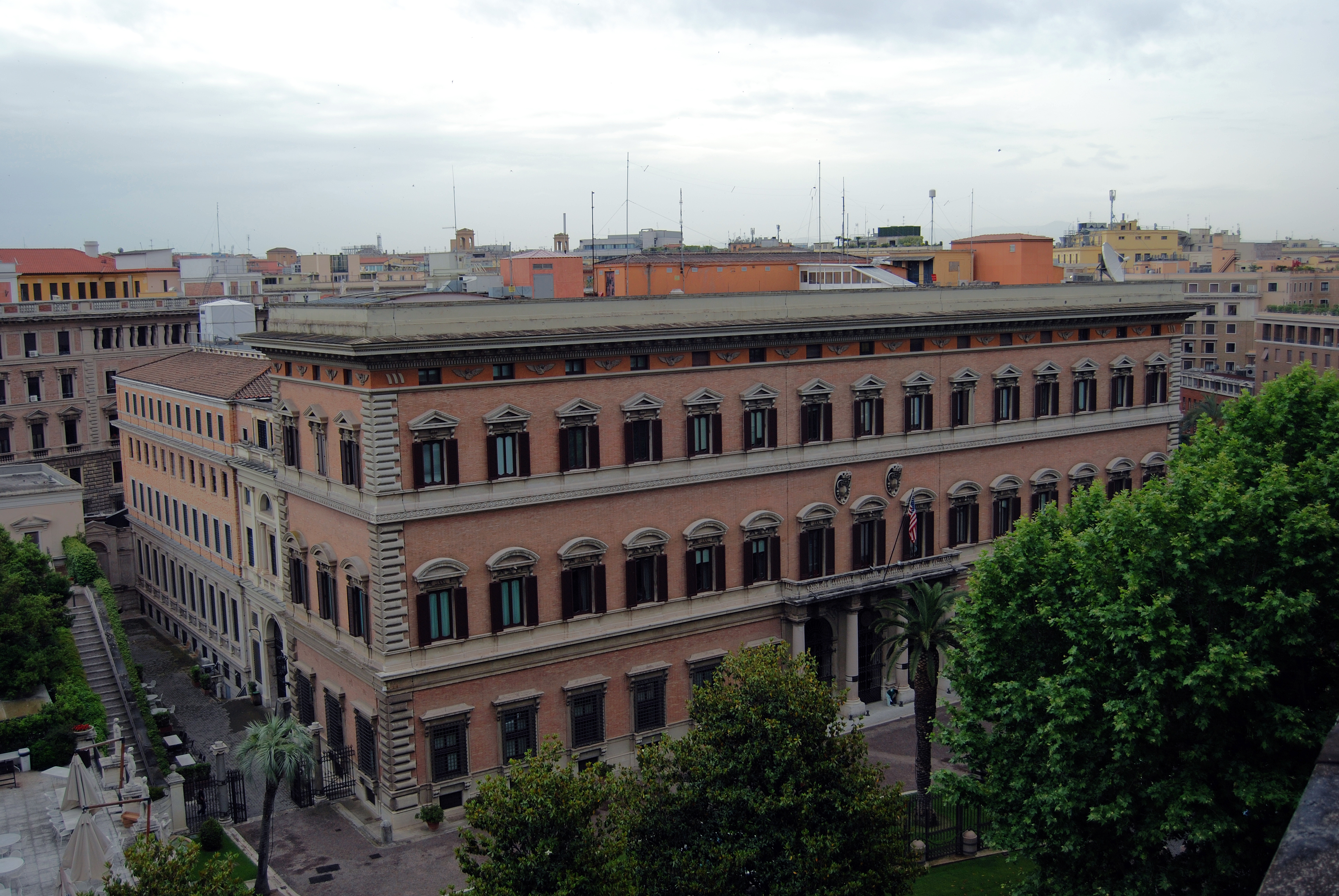
Embassy of the United States in Rome

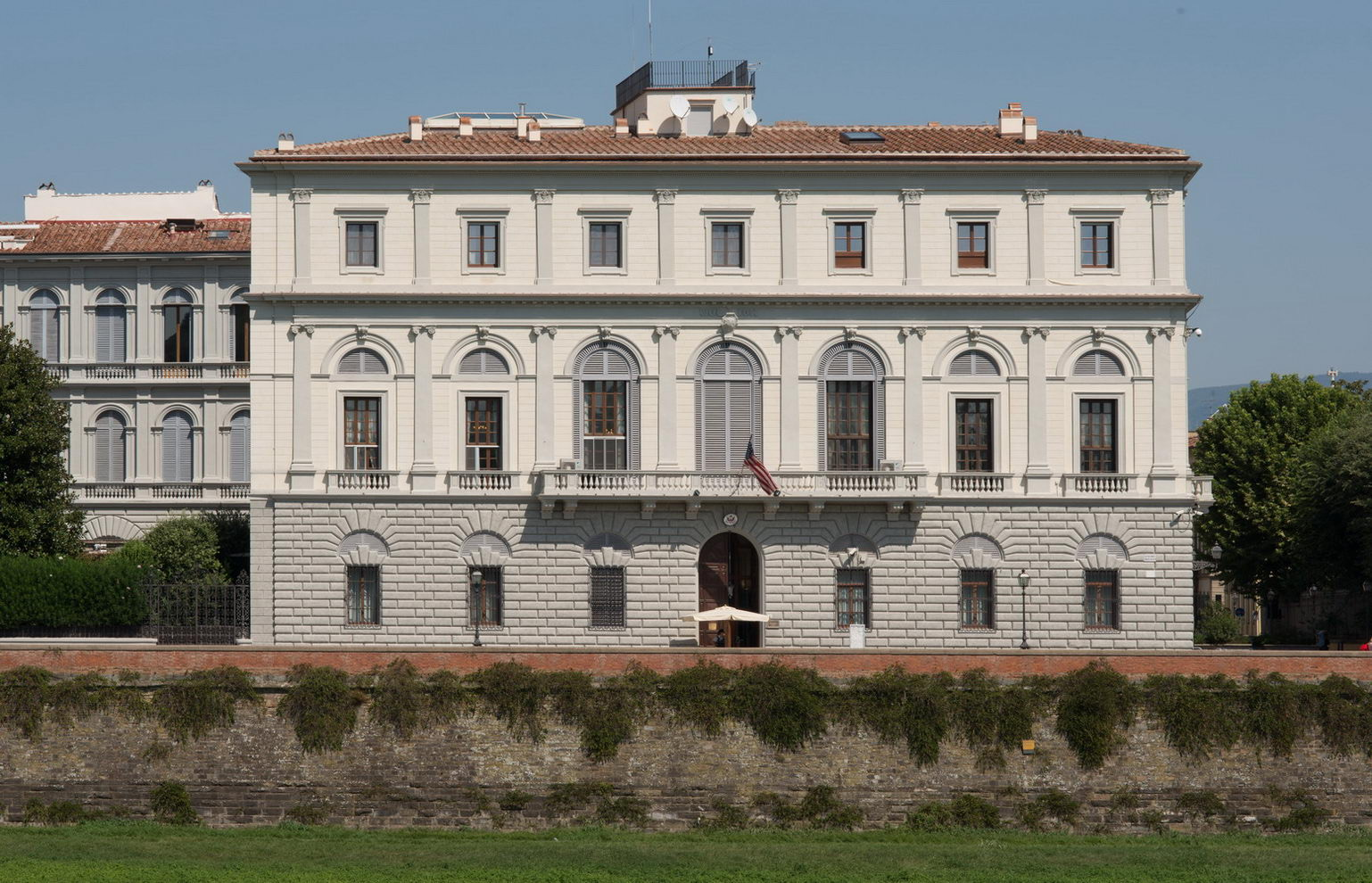
Consulate-General of the United States in Florence

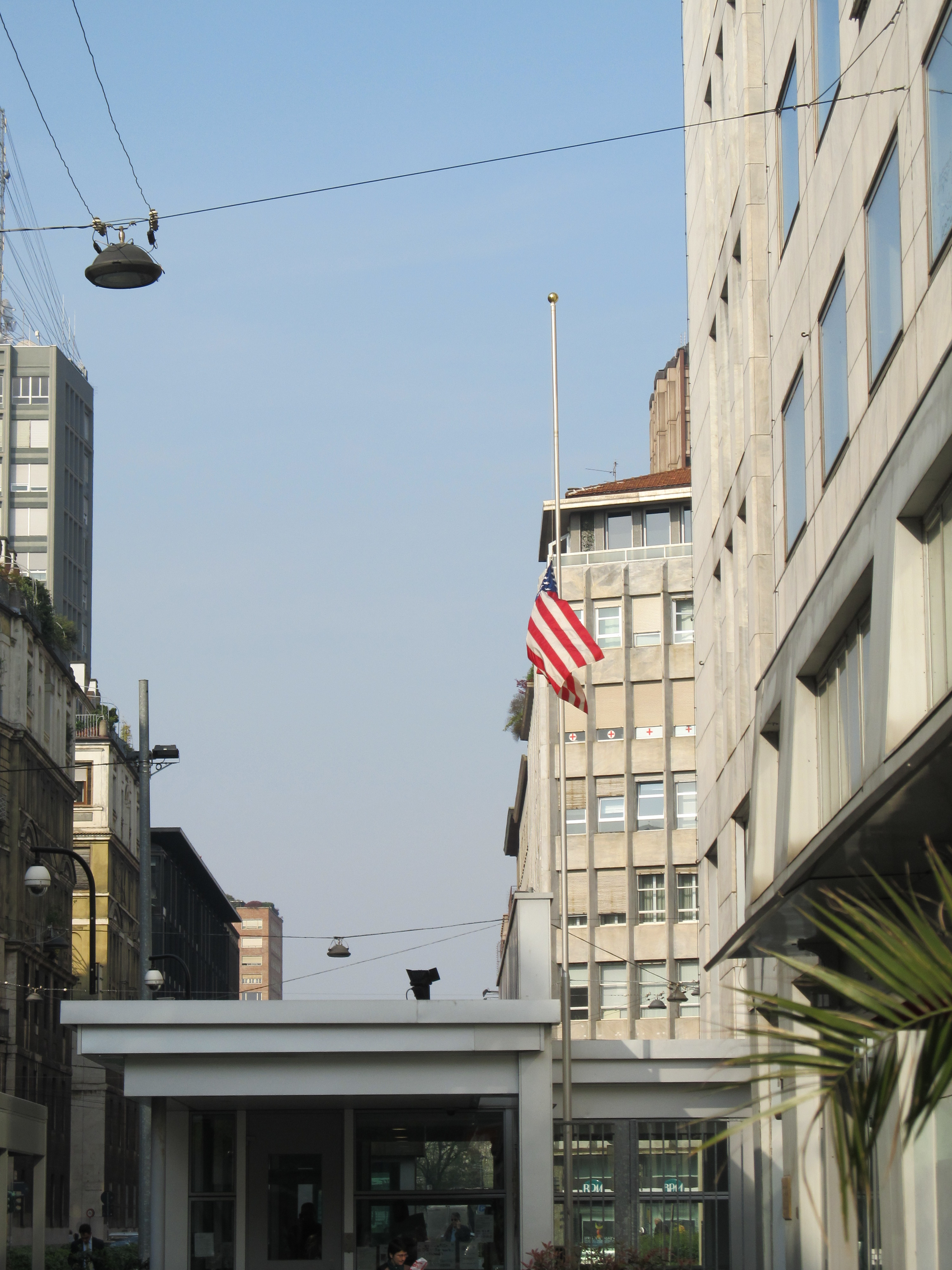
Consulate-General of the United States in Milan

== See also ==
- CIA activities in Italy
- Foreign relations of the United States
- Foreign relations of Italy
- Italian Americans
- Italy–USA Foundation
- Center for American Studies in Rome, Italy
- Italian language in the United States
- United States Ambassador to Italy
- List of Italian-American neighborhoods
- List of ambassadors of Italy to the United States
