= Foreign relations of the United States =

Map of American diplomatic presence around the world: United States of America Countries that have formal diplomatic relations with the United States Countries that do not have formal diplomatic relations with the United States Territories with disputed sovereign status at the United Nations Antarctica

The United States of America has formal diplomatic relations with all United Nations member states except for Bhutan, Iran, and North Korea. Between the two United Nations observer states, the U.S. maintains official ties only with the Holy See; and while it does not recognize Palestine, it has engaged in diplomacy with the Palestinian Authority through dedicated initiatives within the U.S. Embassy to Israel in Jerusalem. The U.S. also has a close but informal relationship with Taiwan, which has had no United Nations status since 1971. Additionally, the U.S. recognized Kosovo in 2008 and has since maintained official relations with it in spite of the country's lack of any United Nations status.

The U.S. federal statutes concerning foreign relations can be found in Title 22 of the United States Code. The U.S. has the second-most diplomatic missions of any country in the world after China.

== List of recognition ==
List of countries with which the United States has established diplomatic relations:

#	Country	Date
1	France	6 August 1778
2	Netherlands	19 April 1782
3	Spain	20 February 1783
4	United Kingdom	1 June 1785
5	Portugal	13 May 1791
6	Denmark	12 October 1801
7	Russia	14 July 1809
8	Sweden	29 April 1818
9	Colombia	19 June 1822
10	Mexico	12 December 1822
11	Argentina	27 December 1823
12	Chile	23 April 1824
13	Brazil	26 May 1824
14	Guatemala	4 August 1824
15	Peru	21 May 1827
16	Belgium	18 June 1832
17	Venezuela	30 June 1835
18	Ecuador	12 August 1848
19	Bolivia	3 January 1849
20	Nicaragua	24 December 1849
21	Costa Rica	24 March 1851
22	Honduras	19 April 1853
23	Switzerland	29 June 1853
24	Japan	29 July 1858
25	Italy	11 April 1861
26	Paraguay	26 November 1861
27	Haiti	1 October 1862
28	El Salvador	15 June 1863
29	Liberia	23 February 1864
30	Uruguay	2 October 1867
31	Greece	16 June 1868
32	Romania	14 June 1880
33	Thailand	23 October 1882
34	Serbia	10 November 1882
—	Iran (severed)	11 June 1883
35	Dominican Republic	26 March 1884
36	Cuba	27 May 1902
37	Luxembourg	17 July 1903
38	Bulgaria	19 September 1903
39	Panama	13 November 1903
40	Ethiopia	27 December 1903
41	Norway	30 October 1905
42	Poland	2 May 1919
43	Finland	27 May 1919
44	Czech Republic	11 June 1919
45	Austria	8 November 1921
46	Hungary	17 December 1921
47	Egypt	26 April 1922
48	Albania	4 December 1922
49	Ireland	7 October 1924
50	Turkey	17 February 1927
51	Canada	18 February 1927
52	South Africa	5 November 1929
53	Iraq	30 March 1931
54	Afghanistan	4 May 1935
55	Australia	8 January 1940
56	Saudi Arabia	4 February 1940
57	Iceland	30 September 1941
58	New Zealand	16 February 1942
59	Lebanon	16 November 1944
60	Syria	17 November 1944
61	Yemen	4 March 1946
62	Philippines	4 July 1946
63	India	1 November 1946
64	Pakistan	15 August 1947
65	Myanmar	18 September 1947
66	Nepal	16 February 1948
67	Sri Lanka	29 October 1948
68	Jordan	18 February 1949
69	South Korea	25 March 1949
70	Israel	28 March 1949
71	Indonesia	28 December 1949
72	Cambodia	11 July 1950
73	Laos	29 July 1950
74	Germany	2 July 1951
75	Libya	24 December 1951
76	Sudan	15 February 1956
77	Tunisia	6 June 1956
78	Morocco	11 June 1956
79	Ghana	6 March 1957
80	Malaysia	31 August 1957
81	Guinea	13 February 1959
82	Cameroon	1 January 1960
83	Togo	27 April 1960
84	Mali	20 June 1960
85	Madagascar	25 June 1960
86	Democratic Republic of the Congo	30 June 1960
87	Somalia	1 July 1960
88	Benin	1 August 1960
89	Niger	3 August 1960
90	Burkina Faso	5 August 1960
91	Ivory Coast	7 August 1960
92	Chad	11 August 1960
93	Central African Republic	13 August 1960
94	Republic of the Congo	15 August 1960
95	Cyprus	16 August 1960
96	Gabon	17 August 1960
97	Senegal	24 September 1960
98	Nigeria	1 October 1960
99	Mauritania	28 November 1960
100	Sierra Leone	27 April 1961
101	Kuwait	22 September 1961
102	Tanzania	9 December 1961
103	Burundi	1 July 1962
104	Rwanda	1 July 1962
105	Jamaica	16 August 1962
106	Trinidad and Tobago	31 August 1962
107	Algeria	29 September 1962
108	Uganda	9 October 1962
109	Kenya	2 March 1964
110	Malawi	6 July 1964
111	Malta	21 September 1964
112	Zambia	24 October 1964
113	Gambia	9 August 1965
114	Singapore	4 April 1966
115	Maldives	9 April 1966
116	Guyana	26 May 1966
117	Botswana	30 September 1966
118	Lesotho	4 October 1966
119	Barbados	30 November 1966
120	Mauritius	12 March 1968
121	Eswatini	6 September 1968
122	Equatorial Guinea	21 November 1968
123	Samoa	14 July 1971
124	Fiji	22 July 1971
125	Bahrain	21 September 1971
126	Qatar	19 March 1972
127	United Arab Emirates	20 March 1972
128	Oman	17 April 1972
129	Bangladesh	18 May 1972
130	Tonga	6 November 1972
131	Bahamas	10 July 1973
132	Grenada	29 November 1974
133	Cape Verde	19 July 1975
134	Guinea-Bissau	3 September 1975
135	Papua New Guinea	16 September 1975
136	Mozambique	23 September 1975
137	São Tomé and Príncipe	10 October 1975
138	Suriname	25 November 1975
139	Seychelles	1 July 1976
140	Nauru	24 October 1976
141	Djibouti	27 June 1977
142	Comoros	15 August 1977
143	Solomon Islands	9 October 1978
144	China	1 January 1979
145	Tuvalu	10 May 1979
146	Saint Lucia	11 June 1979
147	Dominica	18 July 1979
148	Zimbabwe	18 April 1980
149	Kiribati	12 August 1980
150	Belize	29 October 1981
151	Antigua and Barbuda	1 November 1981
152	Saint Vincent and the Grenadines	8 December 1981
153	Saint Kitts and Nevis	20 September 1983
—	Holy See	10 January 1984
154	Brunei	10 March 1984
155	Vanuatu	30 September 1986
156	Federated States of Micronesia	3 November 1986
157	Mongolia	27 January 1987
158	Marshall Islands	26 July 1989
159	Namibia	21 March 1990
160	Estonia	4 September 1991
161	Latvia	5 September 1991
162	Lithuania	6 September 1991
163	Kazakhstan	26 December 1991
164	Kyrgyzstan	27 December 1991
165	Belarus	28 December 1991
166	Ukraine	3 January 1992
167	Armenia	7 January 1992
168	Moldova	18 February 1992
169	Tajikistan	19 February 1992
170	Uzbekistan	19 February 1992
171	Azerbaijan	28 February 1992
172	Georgia	24 March 1992
173	Turkmenistan	10 April 1992
174	Bosnia and Herzegovina	6 August 1992
175	Croatia	6 August 1992
176	Slovenia	6 August 1992
177	Slovakia	4 January 1993
178	Eritrea	11 June 1993
179	Angola	14 July 1994
180	Andorra	21 February 1995
181	Vietnam	11 July 1995
182	North Macedonia	13 September 1995
183	Palau	6 December 1996
184	Liechtenstein	10 February 1997
185	Timor-Leste	20 May 2002
186	Montenegro	15 August 2006
187	San Marino	22 November 2006
188	Monaco	8 December 2006
—	Kosovo	18 February 2008
189	South Sudan	9 July 2011
—	Cook Islands	25 September 2023
—	Niue	25 September 2023

== Bilateral relations ==
=== Americas ===
Country	Formal relations began	Notes
Argentina	1823	See Argentina–United States relations Argentina was integrated into the British international economy in the late 19th century; there was minimal trade with the United States. When the United States began promoting the Pan American Union, some Argentines were suspicious that it was indeed a device to lure the country into the U.S. economic orbit, but most businessmen responded favorably and bilateral trade grew briskly. The United States has a positive bilateral relationship with Argentina based on many common strategic interests, including non-proliferation, counternarcotics, counter-terrorism, the fight against human trafficking, and issues of regional stability, as well as the strength of commercial ties. Argentina is a participant in the Three-Plus-One regional mechanism (Argentina, Brazil, Paraguay, and the United States), which focuses on coordination of counter-terrorism policies in the tri-border region. Argentina has endorsed the Proliferation Security Initiative, and has implemented the Container Security Initiative and the Trade Transparency Unit, both of which are programs administered by the US Department of Homeland Security/Immigration and Customs Enforcement.
Belize	1981	See Belize–United States relations Relations between Belize and the United States have traditionally been close and cordial. The United States is Belize's principal trading partner and major source of investment funds. It is also home to the largest Belizean community outside Belize, estimated to be 70,000 strong. Because Belize's economic growth and accompanying democratic political stability are important U.S. objectives, Belize benefits from the U.S. Caribbean Basin Initiative. Belize hasn't received a direct visit from an American president, the country's leadership has met with various American presidents during meetings along with the Caribbean Community such as the 1997 summit with Bill Clinton in Barbados.
Bolivia	1849	See Bolivia–United States relations The United States and Bolivia have had a tradition of cordial and cooperative relations. Development assistance from the United States to Bolivia dates from the 1940s, and the United States remains a major partner for economic development, improved health, democracy, and the environment. In 1991, the U.S. government forgave all of the $341 million debt owed by Bolivia to the United States Agency for International Development (USAID) as well as 80% ($31 million) of the amount owed to the United States Department of Agriculture for food assistance. The United States has also been a strong supporter of forgiveness of Bolivia's multilateral debt under the HIPC initiatives.
Brazil	1824	See Brazil–United States relations The United States was the second country to recognize the independence of Brazil, doing so in 1824. Brazil-United States relations have a long history, characterized by some moments of remarkable convergence of interests but also by sporadic and critical divergences on sensitive international issues. The United States has increasingly regarded Brazil as a significant power, especially in its role as a stabilizing force and skillful interlocutor in Latin America. As a significant political and economic power, Brazil has traditionally preferred to cooperate with the United States on specific issues rather than seeking to develop an all-encompassing, privileged relationship with the United States.
Canada	1926	See Canada–United States relations Relations between Canada and the United States span more than two centuries, marked by a shared British colonial heritage, conflict during the early years of the US, and the eventual development of one of the most successful international relationships in the modern world. The most serious breach in the relationship was the War of 1812, which saw an American invasion of then British North America and counter invasions from British-Canadian forces. The border was demilitarized after the war and, apart from minor raids, has remained peaceful. Military collaboration began during the World Wars and continued throughout the Cold War, despite Canadian doubts about certain American policies. A high volume of trade and migration between the United States and Canada has generated closer ties. The current bilateral relationship between Canada and the United States is of notable importance to both countries. About 75–85% of Canadian trade is with the United States, and Canada is the United States' largest trading partner and chief supplier of oil. While there are disputed issues between the two nations, relations are close and the two countries share the "world's longest undefended border". A high volume of trade and migration between the United States and Canada since the 1850s has generated closer ties, despite continued Canadian fears of being culturally overwhelmed by its neighbor, which is nine times larger in terms of population and eleven times larger in terms of economy. The two economies have increasingly merged since the North American Free Trade Agreement (NAFTA) of 1994, which also includes Mexico. This economic merger of these two countries was shifted when the Trump era United States–Mexico–Canada Agreement (USMCA) was ratified.
Chile	1824	See Chile–United States relations Relations between Chile and the United States have been better in the period 1988 to 2008 than any other time in history. In the late 1980s and early 1990s, the United States government applauded the rebirth of democratic practices in Chile, Regarded as one of the least corrupt and most vibrant democracies in South America, with a healthy economy, Chile is noted as being a valuable ally of the United States in the Southern Hemisphere. A prime example of cooperation includes the landmark 2003 Chile–United States Free Trade Agreement.
Colombia	1822	See Colombia–United States relations Relations between Colombia and the United States have evolved from mutual cordiality during most of the 19th and early 20th centuries to a recent partnership that links the governments of both nations around several key issues, including fighting communism, the war on drugs, and especially since 9/11, the threat of terrorism. During the last fifty years, different American governments and their representatives have become involved in Colombian affairs through the implementation of policies concerned with the above issues. Some critics of current United States policies in Colombia, such as Law Professor John Barry, consider that US influences have catalyzed internal conflicts and substantially expanded the scope and nature of human rights abuses in Colombia. Supporters, such as Under Secretary of State Marc Grossman, consider that the US has promoted respect for human rights and the rule of law in Colombia, in addition to the fight against drugs and terrorism.
Costa Rica	1851	See Costa Rica–United States relations
Ecuador	1832	See Ecuador–United States relations
El Salvador	1824; 1849	See El Salvador–United States relations
Guatemala	1824; 1844	See Guatemala–United States relations
Guyana	1966	See Guyana–United States relations
Honduras	1824; 1853	See Honduras–United States relations Honduras and the United States have had formal relations since 1830. There is close cooperation between the two countries, particularly in the areas of the war on drugs, while the National Port Authority in Puerto Cortés is part of the U.S. Bureau of Customs and Border Protection's Container Security Initiative.
Mexico	1822	See Mexico–United States relations The United States shares a unique and often complex relationship with the United Mexican States. A history of armed conflict goes back to the Texas Revolution in the 1830s, the Mexican–American War in the 1840s, and an American invasion in the 1910s. Important treaties include the Gadsden Purchase, and multilaterally with Canada, the North American Free Trade Agreement which was changed in the Trump era to the United States–Mexico–Canada Agreement. The two countries have close economic ties, being each other's first and third largest trading partners. They are also closely connected demographically, with over one million U.S. citizens living in Mexico and Mexico being the largest source of immigrants to the United States. Illegal immigration and illegal trade in drugs and firearms have been causes of differences but also of cooperation.
Nicaragua	1824; 1849	See Nicaragua–United States relations Nicaragua and the United States have had diplomatic relations since 1824. Between 1912 and 1933, the United States occupied Nicaragua (see United States occupation of Nicaragua). Following the United States occupation of Nicaragua, in 1933 the Somoza family political dynasty came to power, and would rule Nicaragua until their ouster on July 19, 1979, during the Nicaraguan Revolution. The era of Somoza family rule was characterized by rising inequality and political corruption, strong U.S. support for the government and its military, as well as a reliance on U.S.-based multinational corporations. This led to international condemnation of the regime, and in 1977 the Carter administration cut off aid to the Somoza regime due to its human rights violations. Then during the Reagan administration the diplomatic relations escalated during the Iran-Contra affair and the United States embargo against Nicaragua. Then in 1990, after Violeta Chamorro won the 1990 Nicaraguan general election, the diplomatic relations began to improve greatly. The United States has promoted national reconciliation, encouraging Nicaraguans to resolve their problems through dialogue and compromise. In the Summer 2003 Nicaragua sent around 370 soldiers to the Iraq War as part of the coalition of countries that were engaging in war in this country. Immediately after April 2004 these troops were withdrawn by President Enrique Bolanos. Although President Daniel Ortega has been publicly critical of U.S. policies, the United States and Nicaragua have normal diplomatic relations.
Panama	1903	See Panama–United States relations Panama gained its independence in 1901 due in part to American interest in building the Panama Canal. Relations have been generally strong, with 25,000 U.S. citizens present in Panama and a mutual healthcare program. The United States invaded Panama in 1989 to remove then Panamanian leader Manual Noriega.
Paraguay	1852	See Paraguay–United States relations
Peru	1826	See Peru–United States relations
Suriname	1975	See Suriname–United States relations
Uruguay	1836	See Uruguay–United States relations In 2002, Uruguay and the United States created a Joint Commission on Trade and Investment (JCTI) to exchange ideas on a variety of economic topics. In March 2003, the JCTI identified six areas of concentration until the eventual signing of the Free Trade Area of the Americas (FTAA): customs issues, intellectual property protection, investment, labor, environment, and trade in goods. In late 2004, Uruguay and the United States signed an Open Skies Agreement, which was ratified in May 2006. In November 2005, they signed a Bilateral investment treaty (BIT), which entered into force on November 1, 2006. A Trade and Investment Framework Agreement (TIFA) was signed in January 2007. More than 80 US-owned companies operate in Uruguay, and many more market US goods and services.
Venezuela	1835	See Venezuela-United States relations and Venezuelan presidential crisis Both countries maintained mutual diplomatic relationships since the early-19th century traditionally been characterized by an important trade and investment relationship and cooperation in controlling the production and transit of illegal drugs. Relations were strong under democratic governments in Venezuela, such as those of Carlos Andrés Pérez and Rafael Caldera. After the election of Presidents Hugo Chávez of Venezuela and George W. Bush of the United States, tensions between the countries escalated, reaching a high in September 2008 when Venezuela broke off diplomatic relations with the United States. In January 2019, after US President Donald Trump recognized Juan Guaidó as the Interim President of Venezuela, President Nicolás Maduro cut all diplomatic ties to the United States. They were subsequently restored in 2026 after a military intervention and Maduro's capture. Following the capture, Venezuela became a de facto puppet state.

=== Caribbean ===
Country	Formal relations began	Notes
Antigua and Barbuda	1981	See Antigua and Barbuda–United States relations
Aruba		See Aruba–United States relations
Bahamas	1973	See The Bahamas–United States relations
Barbados	1966	See Barbados–United States relations
Bermuda		See Bermuda–United States relations
Cayman Islands		See Cayman Islands–United States relations
Cuba	1902; 2015	See Cuba–United States relations Following the Cuban Revolution of 1959 relations had deteriorated substantially, and until recently have been marked by tension and confrontation. The United States has initiated an embargo due to the Cuban regime refusal to move toward democratization and greater respect for human rights, hoping to see democratization that took place in Eastern Europe. Maintaining friendly and close relationships between the United States and Cuba were formally re-established on July 20, 2015, with the opening of embassies in both Havana and Washington, D.C.
Dominican Republic	1866	See Dominican Republic–United States relations
Dominica	1978	See Dominica–United States relations
Grenada	1974	See Grenada–United States relations
Haiti	1862	See Haiti–United States relations
Jamaica	1962	See Jamaica–United States relations
Saint Kitts and Nevis	1983	See Saint Kitts and Nevis–United States relations
Saint Lucia	1979	See Saint Lucia–United States relations
Saint Vincent and the Grenadines	1981	See Saint Vincent and the Grenadines–United States relations
Trinidad and Tobago	1962	See Trinidad and Tobago–United States relations

=== Europe ===
American relations with Eastern Europe are influenced by the legacy of the Cold War. Since the collapse of the Soviet Union, former Communist-bloc states in Europe have gradually transitioned to democracy and capitalism. Many have also joined the European Union and NATO, strengthening economic ties with the broader Western world and gaining the military protection of the United States via the North Atlantic Treaty.

Country	Formal relations began	Notes
Albania	1922	See Albania–United States relations
Andorra	1995	See Andorra–United States relations
Austria	1921	See Austria–United States relations
Belarus	1991	See Belarus–United States relations The United States has tense relations with Belarus relating to Belarus' human rights record and election irregularities.
Belgium	1832	See Belgium–United States relations
Bosnia and Herzegovina	1992	See Bosnia and Herzegovina–United States relations
Bulgaria	1903	See Bulgaria–United States relations
Croatia	1992	See Croatia–United States relations
Cyprus	1960	See Cyprus–United States relations
Czech Republic	1993	See Czech Republic–United States relations P20230222AS-0695 (52735381610)
Denmark	1801	See Denmark–United States relations
Estonia	1922; 1991	See Estonia–United States relations
Finland	1919	See Finland–United States relations: Finland has an embassy in Washington, D.C. and consulates-general in Los Angeles and New York City.; the United States has an embassy in Helsinki.; Both countries are members of the Arctic Council, OECD, OSCE, NATO and the United Nations.; the United States fully supported Finland's application to join NATO, which resulted in membership on 4 April 2023.
France	1778	See France–United States relations France was the first foreign state to establish diplomatic relations with the United States.
Georgia	1992	See Georgia–United States relations
Germany	1797	See Germany–United States relations In the political sphere, Germany stands at the center of European Union affairs and plays a key leadership role as a member of the G-7, G-20, the North Atlantic Treaty Organization (NATO) and the Organization on Security and Cooperation in Europe (OSCE). The United States recognizes that the security and prosperity of the United States and Germany significantly depend on each other.
Greece	1868	See Greece–United States relations
Holy See	1984	See Holy See–United States relations
Hungary	1921	See Hungary–United States relations
Iceland	1944	See Iceland–United States relations
Ireland	1924	See Ireland–United States relations
Italy	1861	See Italy–United States relations
Kazakhstan	1991	See Kazakhstan–United States relations
Kosovo	1999	See Kosovo–United States relations The United States was one of the first countries to recognize Kosovo. The UN Security Council divided on the question of Kosovo's declaration of independence. Kosovo declared its independence on February 17, 2008, whilst Serbia objected that Kosovo is part of its territory. Of the five members with veto power in the UN Security Council, the US, UK, and France recognized the declaration of independence, and China has expressed concern, while Russia considers it illegal. "In its declaration of independence, Kosovo committed itself to the highest standards of democracy, including freedom and tolerance and justice for citizens of all ethnic backgrounds", President George W. Bush said on February 19, 2008. Both countries enjoy excellent relationships.
Latvia	1922; 1991	See Latvia–United States relations
Liechtenstein	1997	See Liechtenstein–United States relations
Lithuania	1922; 1991	See Lithuania–United States relations
Luxembourg	1903	See Luxembourg–United States relations
Malta	1964	See Malta–United States relations
Moldova	1992	See Moldova–United States relations
Monaco	2006	See Monaco–United States relations
Montenegro	1905; 2006	See Montenegro–United States relations
Netherlands	1781	See Netherlands–United States relations The Dutch colony of Sint Eustatius was the first foreign state to recognize the independence of the United States, doing so in 1776. However, the Dutch Republic neither authorized the recognition nor ratified it, therefore Morocco remains the first sovereign nation to officially recognize the United States.: the Netherlands has an embassy in Washington, D.C. and consulates-general in Atlanta, Chicago, Miami, New York City and San Francisco.; the United States has an embassy in The Hague and consulates-general in Amsterdam and Willemstad, Curaçao.; Both countries are members of NATO, OECD, OSCE and the United Nations.
North Macedonia	1995	See North Macedonia–United States relations
Norway	1905	See Norway–United States relations
Poland	1919	See Poland–United States relations
Portugal	1791	See Portugal–United States relations
Romania	1880	See Romania–United States relations
Russia	1809; 1991	See Russia–United States relations
San Marino	1861	See San Marino–United States relations
Serbia	1882; 2002	See Serbia–United States relations
Slovakia	1993	See Slovakia–United States relations
Slovenia	1992	See Slovenia–United States relations
Spain	1783	See Spain–United States relations
Sweden	1783	See Sweden–United States relations: Sweden has an embassy in Washington, D.C. and consulates-general in New York City and San Francisco.; the United States has an embassy in Stockholm.; Both countries are members of the Arctic Council, OECD, OSCE, NATO and the United Nations.; the United States fully supported Sweden's application to join NATO, which resulted in membership on 7 March 2024.
Switzerland	1853	See Switzerland–United States relations
Turkey	1831	See Turkey–United States relations: United States has an embassy in Ankara, a Consulate General in Istanbul and a Consulate in Adana.; Turkey has an embassy in Washington, D.C., and Consulate Generals in Boston, Chicago, Houston, Los Angeles, Miami and New York City.; Both countries are members of OECD, G20, NATO and WTO.; There are direct flights from Istanbul to Atlanta, Boston, Chicago, Houston, Los Angeles, Miami, Newark, San Francisco and Washington, D.C.; Yunus Emre Institute has a local headquarters in Washington, D.C.; Following its NATO membership in 1952 and subsequent hosting of the United States Air Force in Incirlik Air Base, Turkey became the bulwark of NATO's southeastern flank, the directly bordering Warsaw Pact countries. Turkey participated with the United States during the Korean War of the early 1950s and the Gulf War of 1990.
Ukraine	1991	See Ukraine–United States relations
United Kingdom	1783	See United Kingdom–United States relations The USA established diplomatic relations with the United Kingdom on 1 June 1785. UK–US diplomatic relations is commonly described as the "Special Relationship".: The United States maintains an embassy in London.; The United Kingdom is accredited to the United States through its embassy in Washington, D.C.; The UK governed the United States from 1585 to 1783, when the United States achieved full independence. Both countries share common membership of the Atlantic Co-operation Pact, AUKUS, Five Eyes, the G7, the G20, NATO, the OECD, the OSCE, the UKUSA Agreement, the UNSC P5, the United Nations, and the World Trade Organization. Bilateral the two countries have a Double Taxation Convention, an Economic Prosperity Deal, and a Mutual Defence Agreement. Since World War II, the two countries have shared a Special Relationship as part of the Anglosphere. While both the United States and the United Kingdom maintain close relationships with many other nations around the world, the level of cooperation in military planning, execution of military operations, nuclear weapons technology, and intelligence sharing with each other has been described as "unparalleled" among major powers throughout the 20th and early 21st century. The United States and Britain share the world's largest foreign direct investment partnership. American investment in the United Kingdom reached $255.4 billion in 2002, while British direct investment in the United States totaled $283.3 billion.
European Union		See United States–European Union relations The European Union and the United States have the largest bilateral trade and investment relationship and enjoy the most integrated economic relationship in the world. Although overtaken by China in 2021 as the largest EU import source for goods, the US remains the EU's largest trade and investment partner, even without the Transatlantic Trade and Investment Partnership.

=== Africa ===
==== North Africa ====
Country	Formal relations began	Notes
Algeria	1962	See Algeria–United States relations The official US presence in Algeria is expanding following over a decade of limited staffing, reflecting the general improvement in the security environment. During the past three years, the US embassy has moved toward more normal operations and now provides most embassy services to the American and Algerian communities.
Egypt	1922	See Egypt–United States relations After the 1973 Arab-Israeli War, Egyptian foreign policy began to shift as a result of the change in Egypt's leadership from President Gamal Abdel-Nasser to Anwar Sadat and the emerging peace process between Egypt and Israel. Sadat realized that reaching a settlement of the Arab-Israeli conflict is a precondition for Egyptian development. To achieve this goal, Sadat ventured to enhance Egypt–United States relations to foster a peace process with Israel.
Libya	1951	See Libya–United States relations In 2011, the United States cut diplomatic relations with the Gaddafi regime. The United States recognized the National Transitional Council as the legitimate government of Libya on July 15, 2011.
Morocco	1786	See Morocco–United States relations Morocco was the first sovereign nation to recognize the United States in 1777. American-Moroccan relations were formalized in a 1786 treaty, which is still in force and is the oldest unbroken bilateral treaty in American history.
Sudan	1956	See Sudan–United States relations
Tunisia	1795	See Tunisia–United States relations
Arab League		See Arab–American relations The Arab League has a representation headquarter, and several offices in the U.S.

==== Sub-Saharan Africa ====
Country	Formal relations began	Notes
Angola	1994	See Angola–United States relations Relations were tense during the Angolan Civil War when the US government backed UNITA rebels, but have warmed since the Angolan government renounced Marxism in 1992.
Benin	1960	See Benin–United States relations The two nations have had an excellent history of relations in the years since Benin embraced democracy. The US government continues to assist Benin with the improvement of living standards that are key to the ultimate success of Benin's experiment with democratic government and economic liberalization, and are consistent with US values and national interest in reducing poverty and promoting growth. The bulk of the US effort in support of consolidating democracy in Benin is focused on long-term human resource development through USAID programs.
Botswana	1966	See Botswana–United States relations
Burkina Faso	1960	See Burkina Faso–United States relations
Burundi	1962	See Burundi–United States relations
Cameroon	1960	See Cameroon–United States relations
Cape Verde	1975	See Cape Verde–United States relations
Central African Republic	1960	See Central African Republic–United States relations
Chad	1960	See Chad–United States relations
Comoros	1977	See Comoros–United States relations
Côte d'Ivoire	1960	See Côte d'Ivoire–United States relations
Democratic Republic of the Congo	1960	See Democratic Republic of the Congo–United States relations
Djibouti	1977	See Djibouti–United States relations
Equatorial Guinea	1968	See Equatorial Guinea–United States relations
Eritrea	1993	See Eritrea–United States relations
Eswatini	1968	See Eswatini–United States relations
Ethiopia	1903	See Ethiopia–United States relations
Gabon	1960	See Gabon–United States relations
Ghana	1957	See Ghana–United States relations
Guinea	1959	See Guinea–United States relations
Guinea-Bissau	1975	See Guinea-Bissau–United States relations
Kenya	1964	See Kenya–United States relations
Lesotho	1966	See Lesotho–United States relations
Liberia	1864	See Liberia–United States relations
Madagascar	1874	See Madagascar–United States relations
Malawi	1964	See Malawi–United States relations
Mali	1960	See Mali–United States relations
Mauritania	1960	See Mauritania–United States relations
Mauritius	1968	See Mauritius–United States relations
Mozambique	1975	See Mozambique–United States relations
Namibia	1990	See Namibia–United States relations
Niger	1960	See Niger–United States relations
Nigeria	1960	See Nigeria–United States relations
Republic of the Congo	1960	See Republic of the Congo–United States relations
Rwanda	1962	See Rwanda–United States relations
São Tomé and Príncipe	1976	See São Tomé and Príncipe–United States relations
Senegal	1960	See Senegal–United States relations
Seychelles	1976	See Seychelles–United States relations
Sierra Leone	1961	See Sierra Leone–United States relations
Somalia	1960	See Somalia–United States relations
South Africa	1929	See South Africa–United States relations
South Sudan	2011	See South Sudan–United States relations
Tanzania	1961	See Tanzania–United States relations
The Gambia	1965	See The Gambia–United States relations
Togo	1960	See Togo–United States relations
Uganda	1962	See Uganda–United States relations Bilateral relations between the United States and Uganda have been good since Yoweri Museveni assumed power, and the United States has welcomed his efforts to end human rights abuses and to pursue economic reform. Uganda is a strong supporter of the Global War on Terror. The United States is helping Uganda achieve export-led economic growth through the African Growth and Opportunity Act and provides a significant amount of development assistance. At the same time, the United States is concerned about continuing human rights problems and the pace of progress toward the establishment of genuine political pluralism.
Zambia	1964	See United States–Zambia relations The diplomatic relationship between the United States and Zambia can be characterized as warm and cooperative. The United States works closely with the Zambian Government to defeat the HIV/AIDS pandemic that is ravaging Zambia, to promote economic growth and development, and to effect political reform needed to promote responsive and responsible government. The United States is also supporting the government's efforts to root out corruption. Zambia is a beneficiary of the African Growth and Opportunity Act (AGOA). The US government provides a variety of technical assistance and other support that is managed by the Department of State, USAID, Millennium Challenge Corporation (MCC) Threshold Program, Centers for Disease Control and Prevention, Department of the Treasury, Department of Defense, and the Peace Corps. The majority of US assistance is provided through the President's Emergency Plan for AIDS Relief (PEPFAR), in support of the fight against HIV/AIDS.
Zimbabwe	1980	See United States–Zimbabwe relations After Morgan Tsvangirai, Mugabe's rival and leader of the Movement for Democratic Change, became Prime Minister of Zimbabwe under a power-sharing agreement, the Barack Obama administration extended its congratulations to Tsvangirai, but said that the US would wait for evidence of Mugabe's cooperation with the MDC before it would consider lifting its sanctions. In early March 2009, Obama proclaimed that US sanctions would be protracted provisionally for another year, because Zimbabwe's political crisis is as yet unresolved.

=== Asia ===
==== West Asia and Middle East ====
The United States has many important allies in the Greater Middle East region. These allies are Turkey, Saudi Arabia, Morocco, Jordan, Afghanistan (formerly), Israel, Egypt, Kuwait, Bahrain and Qatar. Israel and Egypt are leading recipients of United States foreign aid, receiving $2.775 billion and 1.75 billion in 2010. Turkey is an ally of the United States through its membership in NATO, while all of the other countries except Saudi Arabia and Qatar are major non-NATO allies.

The United States toppled the government of Saddam Hussein during the 2003 invasion of Iraq. Turkey is host to approximately 90 B61 nuclear bombs at Incirlik Air Base. Other allies include Qatar, where 3,500 US troops are based, and Bahrain, where the United States Navy maintains NSA Bahrain, home of NAVCENT and the Fifth Fleet.

Country	Formal relations began	Notes
Armenia	1920; 1991	See Armenia–United States relations: Armenia has an embassy in Washington, D.C.; United States has an embassy in Yerevan.; United States has recognized the Armenian genocide in 2019 and 2021.; The Armenia–United States Strategic Partnership Charter was signed on 14 January 2025.
Azerbaijan	1918-1928, 1991	See Azerbaijan–United States relations: Azerbaijan has an embassy in Washington, D.C. and consulate-general in Los Angeles.; the United States has an embassy in Baku.
Bahrain	1971	See Bahrain–United States relations
Cyprus	1960	See Cyprus–United States relations
Georgia	1992	See Georgia–United States relations
Iran	Diplomatic relations severed in 1980	See Iran–United States relations The United States and the Sublime State of Iran recognized each other in 1850. Diplomatic relations were established in 1883 and severed in 1980.
Iraq	1931; 1984; 2004	See Iraq–United States relations
Israel	1949	See Israel–United States relations
Jordan	1949	See Jordan–United States relations
Kuwait	1961	See Kuwait–United States relations
Lebanon	1944	See Lebanon–United States relations
Oman	1972	See Oman–United States relations
Qatar	1972	See Qatar–United States relations
Saudi Arabia	1940	See Saudi Arabia–United States relations
Syria	1944	See Syria–United States relations
Turkey	1831	See Turkey–United States relations: United States has an embassy in Ankara, a Consulate General in Istanbul and a Consulate in Adana.; Turkey has an embassy in Washington, D.C. and Consulate Generals in Boston, Chicago, Houston, Los Angeles, Miami and New York City.; Both countries are members of OECD, G20, NATO and WTO.; There are direct flights from Istanbul to Atlanta, Boston, Chicago, Houston, Los Angeles, Miami, Newark, San Francisco and Washington, D.C.; Yunus Emre Institute has a local headquarters in Washington, D.C.; Following its NATO membership in 1952 and subsequent hosting of the United States Air Force in Incirlik Air Base, Turkey became the bulwark of NATO's southeastern flank, the directly bordering Warsaw Pact countries. Turkey participated with the United States during the Korean War of the early 1950s and the Gulf War of 1990.
United Arab Emirates	1972	See United Arab Emirates–United States relations The United States was the third country to establish formal diplomatic relations with the UAE and has had an ambassador resident in the UAE since 1974. The two countries have enjoyed friendly relations with each other and have developed into friendly government-to-government ties which include security assistance. UAE and US had enjoyed private commercial ties, especially in petroleum. The quality of UAE–US relations increased dramatically as a result of the US-led coalition's campaign to end the Iraqi occupation of Kuwait. UAE ports host more US Navy ships than any port outside the US.
Yemen	1946	See United States–Yemen relations Traditionally, United States – Yemen relations have been tepid, as the lack of strong military-to-military ties, commercial relations, and support of Yemeni President Ali Abdullah Saleh has hindered the development of strong bilateral ties. During the early years of the George W. Bush administration, relations improved under the rubric of the war on terror, though Yemen's lack of policies toward wanted terrorists has stalled additional US support.

==== Central Asia ====
Country	Formal relations began	Notes
Kazakhstan	1991	See Kazakhstan–United States relations
Kyrgyzstan	1993	See Kyrgyzstan–United States relations
Tajikistan	1991	See Tajikistan–United States relations
Turkmenistan	1991	See Turkmenistan–United States relations The US embassy, USAID, and the Peace Corps are located in Ashgabat, Turkmenistan. The United States and Turkmenistan continue to disagree about the country's path toward democratic and economic reform. The United States has publicly advocated industrial privatization, market liberalization, and fiscal reform, as well as legal and regulatory reforms to open up the economy to foreign trade and investment, as the best way to achieve prosperity and true independence and sovereignty.
Uzbekistan	1991	See United States–Uzbekistan relations Relations improved slightly in the latter half of 2007, but the U.S.A. continues to call for Uzbekistan to meet all of its commitments under the March 2002 Declaration of Strategic Partnership between the two countries. The declaration covers not only security and economic relations but political reform, economic reform, and human rights. Uzbekistan has Central Asia's largest population and is vital to US, regional, and international efforts to promote stability and security.

==== South Asia ====
Country	Formal relations began	Notes
Afghanistan	1935	See Afghanistan–United States relations In 2021, the Taliban overthrew the U.S.-backed Islamic Republic of Afghanistan concurrent with the withdrawal of U.S. troops, leading to the relocation of the U.S. Embassy in Kabul to Doha, Qatar. On November 12, 2021, the U.S. announced that an interests section would open at the Embassy of Qatar in Kabul on December 31, to serve as the protecting power for the U.S. in Afghanistan. The Islamic Republic's diplomatic missions to the U.S. operated independently for several months before shutting down operations and transferring custody of the properties to the U.S. State Department on March 16, 2022. Afghanistan has no protecting power in the U.S.
Bangladesh	1972	See Bangladesh–United States relations Today the relationship between the two countries is based on what is described by American diplomats as the "three Ds", meaning Democracy, Development and Denial of space for terrorism. The United States is closely working with Bangladesh in combating Islamic extremism and terrorism and is providing hundreds of millions of dollars every year in economic assistance.
Bhutan	Does not have formal, only informal relations	See Bhutan–United States relations While the United States has no formal diplomatic relations with Bhutan, it maintains informal contact through its embassy in New Delhi, India. The US has offered to resettle 60,000 of the 107,000 Bhutanese refugees of Nepalese origin now living in seven UN refugee camps in southeastern Nepal.
India	1947	See India–United States relations The relationships between India in the days of the British Raj and the US were thin. Swami Vivekananda promoted Yoga and Vedanta in America at the World's Parliament of Religions in Chicago, during the World's Fair in 1893. Mark Twain visited India in 1896 and described it in his travelogue Following the Equator with both revulsion and attraction before concluding that India was the only foreign land he dreamed about or longed to see again. Regarding India, Americans learned more from English writer Rudyard Kipling. Mahatma Gandhi had an important influence on the philosophy of non-violence promoted by Martin Luther King Jr. in the 1950s. At present, India and the US share an extensive and expanding cultural, strategic, military, and economic relationship which is in the phase of implementing confidence building measures (CBM) to overcome the legacy of trust deficit – brought about by adversarial US foreign policies and multiple instances of technology denial – which have plagued the relationship over several decades. Unrealistic expectations after the conclusion of the 2008 India–United States Civil Nuclear Agreement (which underestimated negative public opinion regarding the long-term viability of nuclear power generation and civil-society endorsement for contractual guarantees on safeguards and liability) has given way to pragmatic realism and refocus on areas of cooperation which enjoy favourable political and electoral consensus.
Maldives	1965	See Maldives–United States relations
Nepal	1947	See Nepal–United States relations
Pakistan	1947	See Pakistan–United States relations The United States relationship with Pakistan weakened after the United States troops withdraws Afghanistan in 2021. Pakistan declined an invitation to the US's 'Summit for Democracy' under the Biden administration.
Sri Lanka	1947	See Sri Lanka–United States relations

==== East Asia ====
Country	Formal relations began	Notes
People's Republic of China	1844 (Qing); 1979 (PRC)	See China–United States relations and East Asia island arcs The United States and the People's Republic of China have extensive yet complex economic relationships and partnerships. A great amount of trade between the two countries necessitates positive economic relations, although occasional disagreements over tariffs, currency exchange rates, intellectual property theft, and the political status of Taiwan occurs. The United States has criticized China on such human rights issues as the 1989 Tiananmen Square protests, the persecution of Falun Gong, and more recently the mass detaining of Uyghurs, Kazakhs, and other ethnic and religious minorities in Xinjiang, as well the forced sinicization of Mongols and Tibetans. China has criticized the United States on human rights issues in response and accused the latter of "interfering in China's internal affairs". The United States acknowledges the PRC's One-China policy. The relations deteriorated sharply under Chinese Communist Party general secretary Xi Jinping, with issues such as China's militarization of the South China Sea and Chinese espionage in the United States arising. U.S. president Donald Trump launched a trade war against China, banned U.S. companies from selling equipment to Huawei, increased visa restrictions on Chinese students and scholars, and designated China as a "currency manipulator". The more confrontational policy has endured during the Biden administration, which focuses on China's treatment of Hong Kong, the threats against Taiwan, the persecution of Uyghurs in China, and Chinese cyberwarfare. In response, China has adopted "wolf warrior diplomacy" to counter allegations they see as incorrect and damaging to the American-Chinese dialogue.
Republic of China (Taiwan)	1844 (Qing); 1911 (ended in 1979); 1979 (Taiwan Relations Act - unofficial) 2018 (Taiwan Travel Act) - high-level working partnership	See Taiwan–United States relations The United States recognized the Nationalist Government as the legitimate government of all of China throughout the Chinese Civil War. The U.S. continued to recognize the Republic of China until 1979, when it shifted its recognition to the People's Republic of China in accordance with the One China policy, where the U.S. 'acknowledge', or take note of, the Chinese position on Taiwan but not 'recognizing' or accepting it, which allows the U.S. flexibility to pursue unofficial but robust relations with Taipei. The U.S. continued to provide Taiwan with military aid after 1979, and continued informal relations through the American Institute in Taiwan, and Taiwan is considered to be a strong Asian ally and supporter of the United States. The U.S. Congress passed the Taiwan Travel Act on February 28, 2018, and the bill was subsequently signed into federal law by President Donald Trump, formalizing high-level communications between Washington and Taipei as well as permitting intergovernmental contact at the highest level.
Hong Kong	1992	See Hong Kong–United States relations U.S. foreign policy toward Hong Kong, grounded in a determination to promote Hong Kong's prosperity, autonomy, and way of life, is stated in the U.S.–Hong Kong Policy Act of 1992. It rules that the U.S. would continue to treat Hong Kong apart from the People's Republic of China even after the 1997 transfer of sovereignty marking the end of British rule. The United States maintains substantial economic and political interests in Hong Kong. The United States supports Hong Kong's autonomy by concluding and implementing bilateral agreements; promoting trade and investment; arranging high-level visits; broadening law enforcement cooperation; bolstering educational, academic, and cultural links; and supporting the large community of U.S. citizens and visitors.
Macau	1999	See Macau–United States relations In recognition of Macau's high degree of autonomy, the United States continues to treat Macau as a "special area" distinct from the People's Republic of China. Macau's clothes and textiles continued to enter the United States under quotas separated from those of China. Under the terms of a September 2000 bilateral memorandum of understanding, Macau and the U.S. government cooperate in enforcing textile quotas and preventing illegal trans-shipment. The United States continued periodic visits by U.S. Customs Textile Production Verification Teams to ensure compliance with Macau bilateral textile commitments.
Japan	1854, 1952	See Japan–United States relations The relationship began in the 1850s, as the United States was a major factor in forcing Japan to resume contacts with the outer world beyond a very restricted role. In the late 19th century, the Japanese sent many delegations to Europe, and some to the U.S., to discover and copy the latest technology and thereby modernize Japan very rapidly and allow it to build its own empire. There was some friction over control of Hawaii and the Philippines, but Japan stood aside as the U.S. annexed those lands in 1898. Likewise, the U.S. did not object when Japan took control of Korea. The two nations cooperated with the European powers in suppressing the Boxer Rebellion in China in 1900, but the U.S. was increasingly troubled about Japan's denial of the Open Door Policy that would ensure that all nations could do business with China on an equal basis. President Theodore Roosevelt admired Japan's strength as it defeated a major European power, Russia. He brokered an end to the war between Russia and Japan in 1905–6. Anti-Japanese sentiment (especially on the West Coast) soured relations in the 1907–24 era. In the 1930s, the U.S. protested vehemently against Japan's seizure of Manchuria (1931), its war against China (1937–45), and its seizure of Indochina (Vietnam) 1940–41. American sympathies were with China and Japan rejected increasingly angry American demands that Japan pull out of China. The two nations fought an all-out war 1941–45; the U.S. won a total victory, with heavy bombing (including two atomic bombs on Hiroshima and Nagasaki) that devastated Japan's 50 largest industrial cities. The U.S. Army under Douglas MacArthur occupied and ruled Japan, 1945–51, with the successful goal of sponsoring a peaceful, prosperous and democratic nation. In 1951, the United States and Japan signed Treaty of San Francisco and Security Treaty Between the United States and Japan, subsequently revised as Treaty of Mutual Cooperation and Security between the United States and Japan in 1960, relations since then have been excellent. The United States considers Japan to be one of its closest allies, and it is both a major non-NATO ally and NATO contact country. The United States has several military bases in Japan including Yokosuka, which harbors the US 7th Fleet. The JSDF, or Japanese Self Defense Force, cross-train with the U.S. military, often providing auxiliary security and conducting war games.
Mongolia	1987	See Mongolia–United States relations
North Korea	1882 (Joseon); Only Informal Relations with the DPRK	See North Korea–United States relations Diplomatic relations severed in 2018
South Korea	1882 (Joseon); 1949 (Republic)	See South Korea–United States relations South Korea–United States relations have been most extensive since 1945, when the United States helped establish capitalism in South Korea and led the UN-sponsored Korean War against North Korea and China (1950–53). South Korea's rapid economic growth, democratization and modernization greatly reduced its U.S. dependency. Large numbers of U.S. forces remain in South Korea. On September 24, 2018, U.S. president Donald Trump signed a renegotiated trade agreement with South Korean President Moon Jae-in.

==== Southeast Asia ====
Many countries in the Association of Southeast Asian Nations (ASEAN) are important partners for United States in both economic and geostrategic aspects. ASEAN's geostrategic importance stems from many factors, including: the strategic location of member countries, the large shares of global trade that pass through regional waters, and the alliances and partnerships which the United States shares with ASEAN member states. In July 2009, the United States signed ASEAN's Treaty of Amity and Cooperation, which establishes guiding principles intended to build confidence among its signatories with the aim of maintaining regional peace and stability. Trade flows are robust and increasing between America and the ASEAN region.

Country	Formal relations began	Notes
Brunei	1984	See Brunei–United States relations The United States welcomed Brunei Darussalam's full independence from the United Kingdom on January 1, 1984, and opened an embassy in Bandar Seri Begawan on that date. Brunei opened its embassy in Washington, D.C. in March 1984. Brunei's armed forces engage in joint exercises, training programs, and other military cooperation with the US. A memorandum of understanding on defense cooperation was signed on November 29, 1994. The Sultan of Brunei visited Washington in December 2002.
Cambodia	1950	See Cambodia–United States relations
Indonesia	1949	See Indonesia–United States relations As the largest ASEAN member, Indonesia has played an active and prominent role in developing the organization. For United States, Indonesia is important for dealing with certain issues; such as terrorism, democracy, and how United States project its relations with Islamic world, since Indonesia has the world's largest Islamic population, and one that honors and respects religious diversity. The United States views Indonesia as a potential strategic ally in Southeast Asia. During his stately visit to Indonesia, US president Barack Obama has held up Indonesia as an example of how a developing nation can embrace democracy and diversity.
Laos	1950	See Laos–United States relations
Malaysia	1957	See Malaysia–United States relations Despite increasingly strained relations under the Mahathir Mohamad government, ties have been thawed under Najib Razak's administration. Economic ties are particularly robust, with the United States being Malaysia's largest trading partner and Malaysia is the tenth-largest trading partner of the US. Annual bilateral trade amounts to $50 billion. The United States and Malaysia launched negotiations for a bilateral free trade agreement (FTA) in June 2006. The United States and Malaysia enjoy strong security cooperation. Malaysia hosts the Southeast Asia Regional Center for Counterterrorism (SEARCCT), where over 2000 officials from various countries have received training. The United States is among the foreign countries that has collaborated with the center in conducting capacity building programmes. The United States and Malaysia share a strong military-to-military relationship with numerous exchanges, training, joint exercises, and visits.
Myanmar	1948	See Myanmar–United States relations Bilateral ties have generally been strained but are slowly improving. The United States has placed broad sanctions on Burma because of the military crackdown in 1988 and the military regime's refusal to honour the election results of the 1990 People's Assembly election. Similarly, the European Union has placed embargoes on Burma, including an arms embargo, cessation of trade preferences, and suspension of all aid with the exception of humanitarian aid. US and European government sanctions against the military government, alongside boycotts and other types direct pressure on corporations by western supporters of the Burmese democracy movement, have resulted in the withdrawal from Burma of most United States and many European companies. However, several Western companies remain due to loopholes in the sanctions. Asian corporations have generally remained willing to continue investing in Myanmar and to initiate new investments, particularly in natural resource extraction. Ongoing reforms have improved relations between Burma and the United States. However the Rohingya Crisis has been deteriorating ties.
Philippines	1946	See Philippines–United States relations The Philippines and the United States have an extremely strong relationship with each other due to their long-standing alliance. The Philippine-USA links stretch back in time. The first Asians in the Americas were the Filipinos. The first recorded advent of Filipinos in what is now the United States date to October 1587 around Morro Bay, California, with the first permanent settlement in Louisiana in 1763, they were named "Manilamen" and they served in the Battle of New Orleans during the closing stages of the War of 1812, when the British Empire and American Republic once again went to war against each other as Filipinos in Saint Malo supported the American side against the British Empire. One American state, due to it being a former Spanish territory, Texas, was even once called "The New Philippines", so named since the Spanish wanted to replicate the prosperity they achieved in the Philippines, in that territory in the Americas. The Spanish government ceded the Philippines to the United States in the 1898 Treaty of Paris that ended the Spanish–American War and led to the Philippine–American War. The Philippines was a United States colony from 1898 to 1946. The United States finally recognized Philippine independence on July 4, 1946, in the Treaty of Manila. July 4 was observed in the Philippines as Independence Day until August 4, 1964, when, upon the advice of historians and the urging of nationalists, President Diosdado Macapagal signed into law Republic Act No. 4166 designating June 12 as the country's Independence Day. The United States and the Philippines have fought together in many conflicts such as World War I, World War II, the Korean War, Vietnam War, Islamic insurgency in the Philippines, Gulf War and the war on terror. The Philippines and the United States still maintain close, friendly, diplomatic, political and military relations with more than 100,000 US citizens and nationals living in the Philippines and more than 4 million Filipinos living in the United States. Both countries actively cooperate in the trade, investment and financial sectors. The US is also the largest investor in the Philippine economy with an estimated total worth of $63 billion. The United States and the Philippines conduct joint military exercises called the Balikatan that take place once a year to boost relations between the two countries. The US military also conducts humanitarian and aid missions in the Philippines. The Philippines is one out of two major US allies in South East Asia. Since 2003 the US has designated the Philippines as a major non-NATO ally. However, relations between the United States and the Philippines began to deteriorate in 2016 with Philippines president Rodrigo Duterte wanting to form an alliance with China and Russia and separating the country from all connections and ties with the United States, both economically and socially.
Singapore	1965	See Singapore–United States relations
Thailand	1833	See Thailand–United States relations Thailand and the United States are both former Southeast Asia Treaty Organization (SEATO) members, being close partners throughout the Cold War, and are still close allies. Since 2003, the United States has designated Thailand as a major non-NATO ally.
Timor-Leste	2002	See Timor-Leste–United States relations
Vietnam	1950	See United States–Vietnam relations After a 20-year hiatus of severed ties, President Bill Clinton announced the formal normalization of diplomatic relations with Vietnam on July 11, 1995. Subsequent to President Clinton's normalization announcement, in August 1995, both nations upgraded their Liaison Offices opened during January 1995 to embassy status. As diplomatic ties between the nations grew, the United States opened a consulate general in Ho Chi Minh City, and Vietnam opened a consulate in San Francisco. Today, the United States views Vietnam as a potential strategic ally in Southeast Asia.

=== Oceania ===
Country	Formal relations began	Notes
Australia	1940	See Australia–United States relations Australia and the United States have long been close and strategic allies and have traditionally been aligned with the Commonwealth of Nations. The two countries have a shared history, both have previously been British Colonies and many Americans flocked to the Australian goldfields in the 19th century. At the strategic level, the relationship really came to prominence in the Second World War, when the two nations worked extremely closely in the Pacific War against Japan, with General Douglas MacArthur undertaking his role as Supreme Allied Commander based in Australia, effectively having Australian troops and resources under his command. During this period, the cultural interaction between Australia and the United States were elevated to a higher level as over 1 million US military personnel moved through Australia during the course of the war. The relationship continued to evolve throughout the second half of the 20th century, and today now involves strong relationships at the executive and mid levels of government and the military, leading Assistant Secretary of State for East Asian and Pacific Affairs, Kurt M. Campbell to declare that "in the last ten years, [Australia] has ascended to one of the closest one or two allies [of the US] on the planet". It was also strengthened its relationship with the United States as Britain's influence in Asia declined. At the governmental level, United States-Australia relations are formalized by the ANZUS treaty and the Australia–United States Free Trade Agreement.
Cook Islands	1995	See Cook Islands–United States relations The Cook Islands are an Associated State of New Zealand and has consular relations with the United States, in addition as early as 1980, the two sides signed the Cook Islands-United States Maritime Boundary Treaty. On September 25, 2023, the two sides established diplomatic relations.
Fiji	1971	See Fiji–United States relations Relations are currently steady since Fiji's elections in September 2014. The United States had opposed Fiji's unelected government, which came to power through a military coup in December 2006. The United States suspended $2.5 million in aid money pending a review of the situation, following the 2006 coup.
Kiribati	1980	See Kiribati–United States relations Relations between Kiribati and the United States are excellent. Kiribati signed a treaty of friendship with the United States after independence in 1979. The United States has no consular or diplomatic facilities in the country. Officers of the American Embassy in Suva, Fiji, are concurrently accredited to Kiribati and make periodic visits. The US Peace Corps maintained a program in Kiribati from 1974 to 2008.
Marshall Islands	1986	See Marshall Islands–United States relations The Marshall Islands is a sovereign nation in "free association" with the United States. The Marshall Islands and the United States maintain excellent relations. After more than a decade of negotiation, the Marshall Islands and the United States signed the Compact of Free Association on June 25, 1983. The Compact gives the US full authority and responsibility over defense of the Marshall Islands. The Marshall Islands and the United States both lay claim to Wake Island. The Compact that binds the Marshall Islands and the United States is the same one that binds the United States and the Federated States of Micronesia and Palau.
Federated States of Micronesia	1986	See Federated States of Micronesia–United States relations Reflecting a strong legacy of Trusteeship cooperation, over 25 US federal agencies continue to maintain programs in the FSM. The United States and the FSM share very strong relations. Under the Amended Compact, the US has full authority and responsibility for the defense of the FSM. This security relationship can be changed or terminated by mutual agreement. The Compact that binds the US and the FSM is the same one that binds the United States to the Marshall Islands and to Palau.
Nauru	1976	See Nauru–United States relations Relations between Nauru and the United States are complicated. While the new US ambassador to Fiji has promised Nauru assistance in economic development, there have been disagreements about Cuba and Foreign policy of the United States, and the United States does not have an embassy in Nauru; instead, the US embassy staff in Suva, Fiji make periodical visits.
New Zealand	1942	See New Zealand–United States relations United States-New Zealand relations are strong, but complex. The United States has historically assisted New Zealand in times of turmoil; for instance, during World War II, US bombing Hiroshima and Nagasaki, and with the September 2010 Canterbury earthquake and the February 2011 Christchurch earthquake. New Zealand has reciprocated; for example, by participating in the Korean War and the Vietnam War. However, the United States suspended its mutual defense obligations to New Zealand because of the state's non-nuclear policies. In 1996, the United States under President Bill Clinton reinstated New Zealand's status from a 'friend' to an 'ally' by designating New Zealand as a major non-NATO ally. Despite disagreements between the two countries, the bilateral trade, security, and cultural relationship continued to flourish. New Zealand continued to play a supportive role in international conflicts in Somalia, Bosnia, and the Persian Gulf. New Zealand and the United States are close collaborators in the international intelligence alliance, Five Eyes, which is one of the most comprehensive known espionage alliances in history. Following the 9/11 attacks on the United States in 2001, New Zealand supported international counter-terrorism efforts and assisted the United States throughout the war in Afghanistan. Throughout the 2000s, the United States has remained New Zealand's fourth-largest trading partner and third-largest source of visitors.
Niue	25 September 2023	Niue is an Associated State of New Zealand. In 1997, the United States and Niue signed a maritime boundary treaty that included the following statement: "Prior to signing the treaty, the political status of Niue was addressed. Niue is in free association with New Zealand. On internal matters it is self-governing. Niue conducts its foreign affairs in conjunction with New Zealand. Niue has declared and does manage its exclusive economic zone. The United States requested, and received, confirmation from New Zealand that the Government of Niue had the competence to enter into this agreement with the United States." On September 25, 2023, the two sides established diplomatic relations.
Palau	1996	See Palau–United States relations On October 1, 1994, after five decades of US administration, the country of Palau became the last component of the Trust Territory of the Pacific Islands to gain its independence. In 1978, Palau decided not to join the Federated States of Micronesia, due to culture and language differences, and instead sought independence. In 1986, the Compact of Free Association agreement between Palau and the United States was approved, paving the way for Palau's independence.
Papua New Guinea	1975	See Papua New Guinea–United States relations
Samoa	1962	
Solomon Islands	1978	
Tonga	1886; 1972	See Tonga–United States relations
Tuvalu	1978	See Tuvalu–United States relations Relations between the two countries are generally amicable, or neutral, but there have been notable disagreements regarding the issues of climate change and the Kyoto Protocol.
Vanuatu	1986	See United States–Vanuatu relations The United States and Vanuatu established diplomatic relations on September 30, 1986 - three months to the day after Vanuatu had established diplomatic relations with the Soviet Union. Relations were often tense in the 1980s, under the prime ministership of Father Walter Lini in Vanuatu, but eased after that. At present, bilateral relations consist primarily in United States aid to Vanuatu.

== Countries with strained relations with the United States ==
=== Current ===
- Afghanistan (Note: The current government led by the Taliban is unrecognized by the United States government.)
- Belarus
- Burkina Faso
- Burundi
- Central African Republic
- China
- Cuba
- Eritrea
- Iran (Note: Since 1979, Iran and the U.S. have had hostile relations, with official relations being severed in 1980.)
- Libya
- Mali
- Myanmar
- Nicaragua
- Niger
- North Korea (Note: North Korea does not have formal relations with the U.S.)
- Russia
- Somalia
- South Sudan
- Sudan
- Yemen (SPC/Houthi Yemen)
- Zimbabwe

=== Formerly ===
- Afghanistan (1978–1992, 1996–2001) (Again currently)
- (People's Socialist Republic of Albania) Albania (1946–1991)
- Algeria (1967–1974)
- Angola (1976–1993)
- Benin (1975–1990)
- Bolivia (2006–2019)
- Brazil (1961–1964)
- Bulgaria (1946–1990)
- Burundi (2015–2021) (Again currently)
- Cambodia (1965–1969, 1975–1994)
- Chile (1970–1973)
- China (1949–1972, 1989–2001) (Again currently)
- (People's Republic of the Congo) Republic of the Congo (1965–1977)
- Czechoslovakia (1948–1990)
- East Germany (1949–1990)
- Ecuador (2012–2017)
- Equatorial Guinea (1976–1979)
- Egypt (1965–1974)
- (People's Democratic Republic of Ethiopia) Ethiopia (1980–1992)
- (Nazi Germany) Germany (1941–1945)
- Ghana (1964–1966)
- Grenada (1979–1983)
- Guinea (1966–1984, 2021–2025)
- Haiti (1986, 1993–1994)
- Hungary (1949–1989)
- Indonesia (1957–1965)
- Iraq (1990–2003)
- (Kingdom of Italy) Italy (1941–1943)
- (Empire of Japan) Japan (1931–1945)
- Kyrgyzstan (2006)
- Laos (1975–1993)
- Liberia (1971–1980)
- Libya (1969–2011) (Again currently)
- Mongolia (1940s-1987)
- Mozambique (1977–1983)
- Myanmar (1988–2011) (Again currently)
- Nicaragua (1978, 1981–1990, 2016–2018) (Again currently)
- Nigeria (1969–1977, 1993–1998)
- Pakistan (1990–1998)
- Panama (1988–1989)
- Poland (1947–1989)
- Philippines (2016-2022)
- Rhodesia (1965–1979)
- Romania (1947–1968)
- Saudi Arabia (1973-1974, 2001-2003, 2021-2022)
- (Federal Republic of Yugoslavia) Serbia and Montenegro (1990–2003)
- Somalia (1969–1977) (Again currently)
- South Yemen (1970–1990)
- Soviet Union (1950–1991)
- Sudan (1967–1971, 1974–1976, 1989–2019) (Again Currently)
- Syria (Note: Relations have been severed since 2012.) (1979–2024)
- Uganda (1972–1979)
- Venezuela (1999–2026)
- Vietnam (1975–1994)

== Countries with visa services suspended ==
- Burkina Faso
- South Sudan
- Sudan
- Syria

== Former countries ==
- Republic of Artsakh
- Grand Duchy of Baden
- Kingdom of Bavaria
- Duchy of Brunswick
- Federal Republic of Central America
- Greater Republic of Central America
- Congo Free State
- Czechoslovakia
- East Germany
- West Germany
- Republic of Genoa
- German Empire
- Kingdom of Hanover
- (Free City of Bremen) (Free City of Lübeck) (Free City of Hamburg) Hanseatic Republics
- Hawaiian Kingdom
- Grand Duchy of Hesse
- (Grand Duchy of Mecklenburg-Schwerin) Mecklenburg-Schwerin
- Duchy of Nassau
- North German Confederation
- Grand Duchy of Oldenburg
- Orange Free State
- Ottoman Empire
- Papal States
- Duchy of Parma
- (Kingdom of Prussia) Prussia
- Russian Empire
- Ryukyu Kingdom
- Kingdom of Sardinia
- Principality of Schaumburg-Lippe
- Soviet Union
- Republic of Texas
- (Grand Duchy of Mecklenburg-Schwerin) Grand Duchy of Mecklenburg-Strelitz
- Grand Duchy of Tuscany
- Kingdom of the Two Sicilies
- Kingdom of Württemberg
- (Socialist Federal Republic of Yugoslavia) Yugoslavia

== See also ==
- Criticism of United States foreign policy
- East Asia–United States relations
- Emigration from the United States
- Foreign policy of the United States
- History of United States foreign policy
- Immigration to the United States
- List of diplomatic missions in the United States
- List of diplomatic missions of the United States
- Major non-NATO ally
- United States foreign aid
- Visa policy of the United States
- State Sponsors of Terrorism (U.S. list)
- United States foreign adversaries
