= Guinea–United States relations =

- Guinea: United States

Guinea–United States relations are bilateral relations between Guinea and the United States.

According to the 2012 U.S. Global Leadership Report, 89% of Guineans approve of U.S. leadership, with 8% disapproving and 3% uncertain, the most favorable opinion of the U.S. in the entirety of Africa and the world at the time.

== History ==
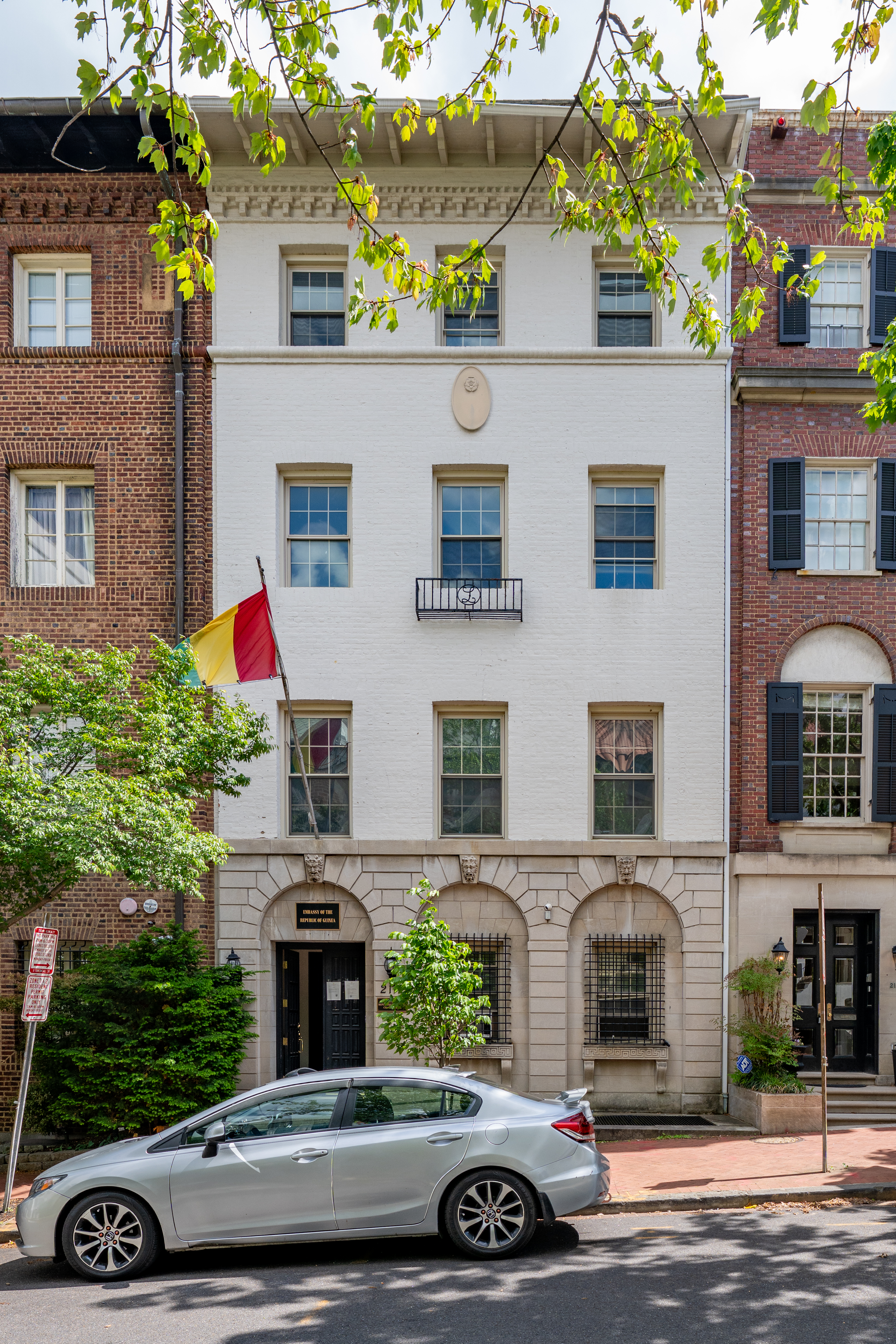
Embassy of Guinea in Washington D.C.

The United States maintains close relations with Guinea. U.S. policy seeks to encourage Guinea's democratic reforms, its positive contribution to regional stability, and sustainable economic and social development. The U.S. also seeks to promote increased U.S. private investment in Guinea's emerging economy.

The U.S. "condemned" Guinea's 2008 military coup, as it had "close relations" with Guinea before the coup. But following the junta holding presidential elections in 2010, the U.S. "re-established strong diplomatic ties" in support of "democratic reform." The U.S. supplied extensive foreign aid to Guinea all throughout the post-coup era.

By contrast, the U.S. State Department instantly condemned Guinea's September 5, 2021 coup d'etat, and warned that "violence and any extra-constitutional measures... could limit the ability of the United States and Guinea’s other international partners to support the country..." The U.S. called for "national dialogue" to find a peaceful and sustainable way "forward."

== U.S. agencies in Guinea ==
Principal U.S. officials include:

- Chargé d'affaires – Mary E. Daschbach

There is a U.S. Embassy located in Koloma, Conakry, Guinea.

The U.S. Mission in Guinea is composed of five agencies-Department of State, U.S. Agency for International Development (USAID), Peace Corps, the United States Treasury Department, and the Department of Defense. In addition to providing the full range of diplomatic functions, the U.S. Mission also manages a military assistance program that provided nearly $331,000 for military education, professionalization, and language training programs.

USAID Guinea is now one of only five sustainable development missions in West Africa, with current core program areas in primary education, family health, democracy and governance, and natural resources management.

After a temporary suspension due to nationwide political unrest in early 2007, the Peace Corps program in Guinea resumed operations at the end of July. Prior to the suspension, Peace Corps had more than 100 volunteers throughout the country, and the program is gradually increasing its numbers again. Volunteers work in four project areas: secondary education, environment/agro-forestry, public health and HIV/AIDS prevention, and small enterprise development. Guinea has also had a strong Crisis Corps program through the last few years.

== See also ==
- Guinean Americans
- Foreign relations of the United States
- Foreign relations of Guinea
- List of ambassadors of Guinea to the United States
