= Burundi–United States relations =

- Burundi: United States

Burundi and the United States have had diplomatic relations since Burundi's independence in 1962.

== History ==
In 1962, the United States established diplomatic relations with Burundi when it gained its independence from Belgium. Following independence, the country experienced political assassinations, ethnic violence, and cyclical periods of armed conflict; several governments were installed through coups. The 2000 Arusha Peace and Reconciliation Agreement provided a negotiated settlement framework that, along with later ceasefire agreements, led to the end of the 1993-2006 civil war. President Pierre Nkurunziza's decision to seek a third presidential term in 2015 sparked protests in the capital and was followed by a failed coup d’état. The resultant violence and political and economic crises resulted in massive refugee flows to neighboring countries.

The United States Embassy in Burundi's policy states: "The goals of the United States Embassy in Burundi are to help the people of Burundi achieve a just and lasting peace based on democratic principles, to assure the welfare and security of U.S. citizens, to protect human rights, to relieve human suffering, and to encourage the economic policies needed for sustainable and broad-based growth."

In 2011, the US sent a military aid package worth $45 million to Burundi and Uganda, which included four drone aircraft.

Relations severely deteriorated in 2015 when Nkurunziza won a third term and Burundi faced sanctions by Barack Obama. During the first Trump administration, the United States threatened to close its embassy in Bujumbura.

In late September 2026, Burundi agreed to accept third country deportees from the United States, who had not been accused of crimes or having terrorist links.

== Principal officials ==
- United States Ambassador to Burundi – Lisa J. Peterson (sworn in on May 28, 2024)
- Burundi Ambassador to the United States - Jean Bosco Barege

== Diplomatic missions ==
The U.S. Embassy is located in Bujumbura. The Embassy of the Republic of Burundi to the United States is in Washington, which Donald Trump threatened to close if Nkurunziza supported Russia while he was president.

== See also ==
- Foreign relations of Burundi
- Foreign relations of the United States
- U.S. Ambassador to Burundi
