= Orange Free State–United States relations =

- Orange Free State: United States

The Orange Free State and the United States began relations in 1871 with the U.S. recognizing the former, but formal relations were never established and ended in 1902 after the signing of the Treaty of Vereeniging concluding the Second Boer War.

== History ==
The United States recognized the Orange Free State when representatives between both states signed the Convention of Friendship and Commerce and Extradition on December 22, 1871, in Bloemfontein, now the current judicial capital of present-day South Africa. The treaty was signed by U.S. Special Agent Willard W. Edgcomb, who served as American Consul at the Cape of Good Hope, and the government secretary of the Orange Free State, Friedrich Kaufmann Höhne. Despite the signing of the agreement, the government of the Orange Free State denounced it on January 4, 1895, twenty-four years later.

On December 16, 1891, Ernst Richard Landgraf was appointed U.S. Consular Agent to the Orange Free State. A consulate office was established in the United States for the Orange Free State until 1902 when the Free State ceased existence.

An extradition treaty was signed on October 28, 1896, in Washington, D.C. by U.S. Secretary of State Richard Olney and the Consul General of the Orange Free State in the United States Charles D. Pierce. The treaty was formally ratified on April 20, 1899, with full effect coming into place the following day on April 21.

Following the British Empire's victory over the Orange Free State in the Second Boer War, it ceased to exist as a sovereign polity, and so did any of its foreign relations - including those with the United States. Despite the end of relations, Consular Agents continued to be appointed to Bloemfontein until it was closed on November 30, 1928.

== See also ==
- Foreign relations of the United States
- Lesotho–United States relations
- South Africa–United States relations
- Congo Free State–United States relations
- Africa–United States relations
