= Bhutan–United States relations =

- Bhutan: United States

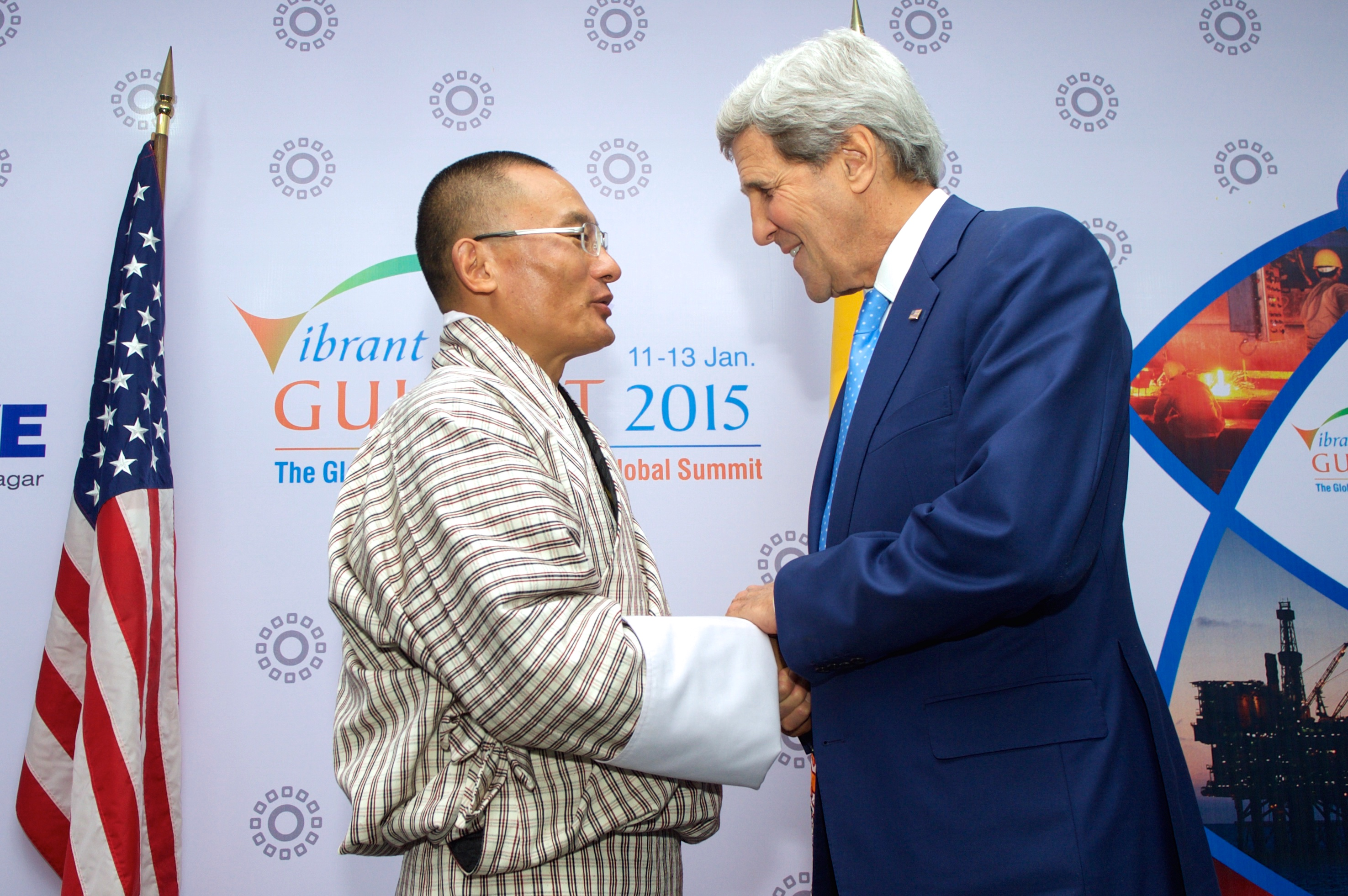
Prime Minister of Bhutan Tshering Tobgay with U.S. secretary of state John Kerry in 2015

Bhutan and the United States have no formal diplomatic relations, but relations between the two nations are viewed as "friendly and close", due to shared values between the two countries. The increasingly close relationship between India and the U.S. has also helped to improve U.S.–Bhutanese relations.

Bhutan is represented in the U.S. through its permanent mission to the United Nations. The United States is represented through the American embassy in New Delhi, India. Bhutan is one of two countries in Asia to have never hosted an American embassy, with the other being North Korea.

== History ==
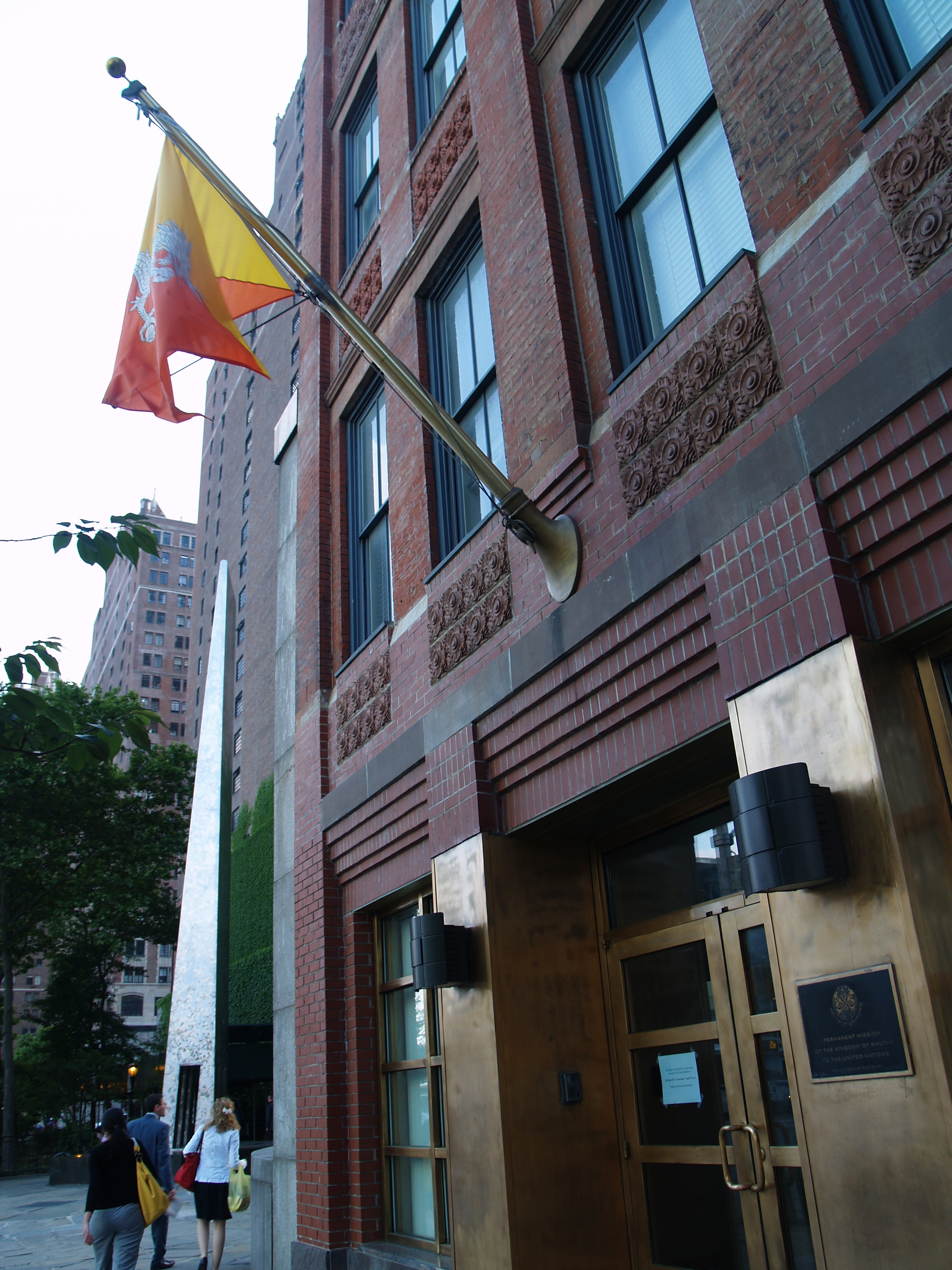
The Permanent Mission of Bhutan to the United Nations in New York City

In 2008, the U.S. offered to resettle 60,000 of the 107,000 Bhutanese refugees of Nepalese origin living in seven U.N. refugee camps in southeastern Nepal.

In 2011, former prime minister of Bhutan Jigme Thinley stated, "If we can have all kinds of interactions, relations and cooperation with the US, as with Germany and France, with which we have no diplomatic relations, what is the purpose (of such relations with Washington)?" On April 7, former U.S. ambassador to India Tim Roemer met with Thinley to discuss ways to further strengthen ties between both countries. Thinley also stated that he had hosted many State Department officials, congressmen, and senators for informal talks since he became head of the government in April 2008 after the country’s first fully democratic elections.

On January 11, 2015, the then–U.S. secretary of state John Kerry met with Bhutanese prime minister Tshering Tobgay at the seventh Vibrant Gujarat summit, marking the first time senior leaders from both countries met with one another. However, there were no plans to establish diplomatic relations. Prior to Secretary Kerry's meeting, the highest-ranking State Department officials to meet with Bhutan's leaders were at the undersecretary level, who had in the past met with the fourth King of Bhutan, Jigme Singye Wangchuck, and fifth King, Jigme Khesar Namgyel Wangchuck.

In March 2025, the Trump administration was reportedly considering a total ban on visas for Bhutanese citizens.

== See also ==
- Foreign relations of Bhutan
- Foreign relations of the United States
- Bhutanese refugees
- Bhutanese Americans
- Bhutan–India relations
- India–United States relations
