= Congo Free State–United States relations =

- Congo Free State: United States

Relations between the Congo Free State and the United States began after recognition between the two states in 1885 when the Congo Free State was established. After Belgium under Leopold II annexed the Congo Free State in 1908, later becoming Belgian Congo, relations ceased between the two nations.

== History ==
The United States outside of Belgium became the first Western nation to recognize the establishment of the Congo Free State on September 11, 1885, in a letter written by President Grover Cleveland to Leopold II. Prior to the recognition of the Free State, the United States Senate authorized President Chester A. Arthur to recognize the International Association of the Congo, the predecessor state of the Free State, declaring, "to recognize the flag of the AIC as the equal of that of an allied government."

George Washington Williams, a former soldier in the American Civil War, visited Belgium and interviewed Leopold II to write articles as a representative for S. S. McClure's Associated Literary Press. Williams became impressed with Leopold and discussed his interest in traveling to the Free State. President of the United States Benjamin Harrison and his administration backed Williams' trip. Arriving in 1890, Williams discovered abuses against the local population of the colony which had been rumored to have been occurring prior to his journey. Among the discovery of the abuses were a private militia employed by Leopold to enforce rubber production by the Congolese, abuse of workers and their families, resulting in a state of slavery for many families, physical mutilation of workers who could not meet production goals, and a high rate of deaths.

From Stanley Falls, Williams wrote "An Open Letter to His Serene Majesty Leopold II, King of the Belgians and Sovereign of the Independent State of Congo" on July 18, 1890. In this letter, he condemned the brutal and inhuman treatment of the Congolese at the hands of Europeans and Africans supervising them for the Congo Free State. He mentioned the role played by Henry Morton Stanley, sent to the Congo by the King, in deceiving and mistreating local Congolese. Williams reminded the King that the crimes committed were all committed in his name, making him as guilty as the perpetrators. He appealed to the international community of the day to "call and create an International Commission to investigate the charges herein preferred in the name of Humanity ...".

The King and his supporters tried to discredit Williams, but he continued to speak out about the abuses in the Congo Free State, helping to generate actions in Belgium and the international community. Eventually, the Belgian government took over supervising the Congo Free State and tried to improve treatment of the Congolese. The letter became famous for coining the term "crimes against humanity".

As a result of the impact of Williams' letter, Leopold II annexed the region on November 15, 1908, ending the Congo Free State's independent existence and becoming the Belgian Congo under the direct rule of the Belgian Empire. The U.S. never established formal diplomatic relations with the Free State as there had been no exchange of diplomats from either side. The region of the Congo Free State would gain independence from Belgium in 1960 becoming Republic of the Congo (Léopoldville), Zaire, and currently the Democratic Republic of the Congo which the U.S. recognized in 1960.

== See also ==
- Foreign relations of the United States
- Democratic Republic of the Congo–United States relations
- Belgium–United States relations
- Orange Free State–United States relations
- Africa–United States relations
