= Czechoslovakia–United States relations =

- Czechoslovakia: United States

Diplomatic mission
- Embassy of the Czech Republic, Washington, D.C.: Embassy of the United States, Prague

Relations between Czechoslovakia and the United States refer to two periods in Czechoslovakia's history. The first being the establishment of Czechoslovakia after its declaration of independence in 1918 from Austria-Hungary initiated by President Woodrow Wilson as part of his Fourteen Points following World War I. The second period being the communist era from 1948 when relations were strained, until 1992 when Czechoslovakia split forming the independent nations of the Czech Republic and Slovakia as a result of the 1989 Velvet Revolution.

== History ==
=== Establishment ===
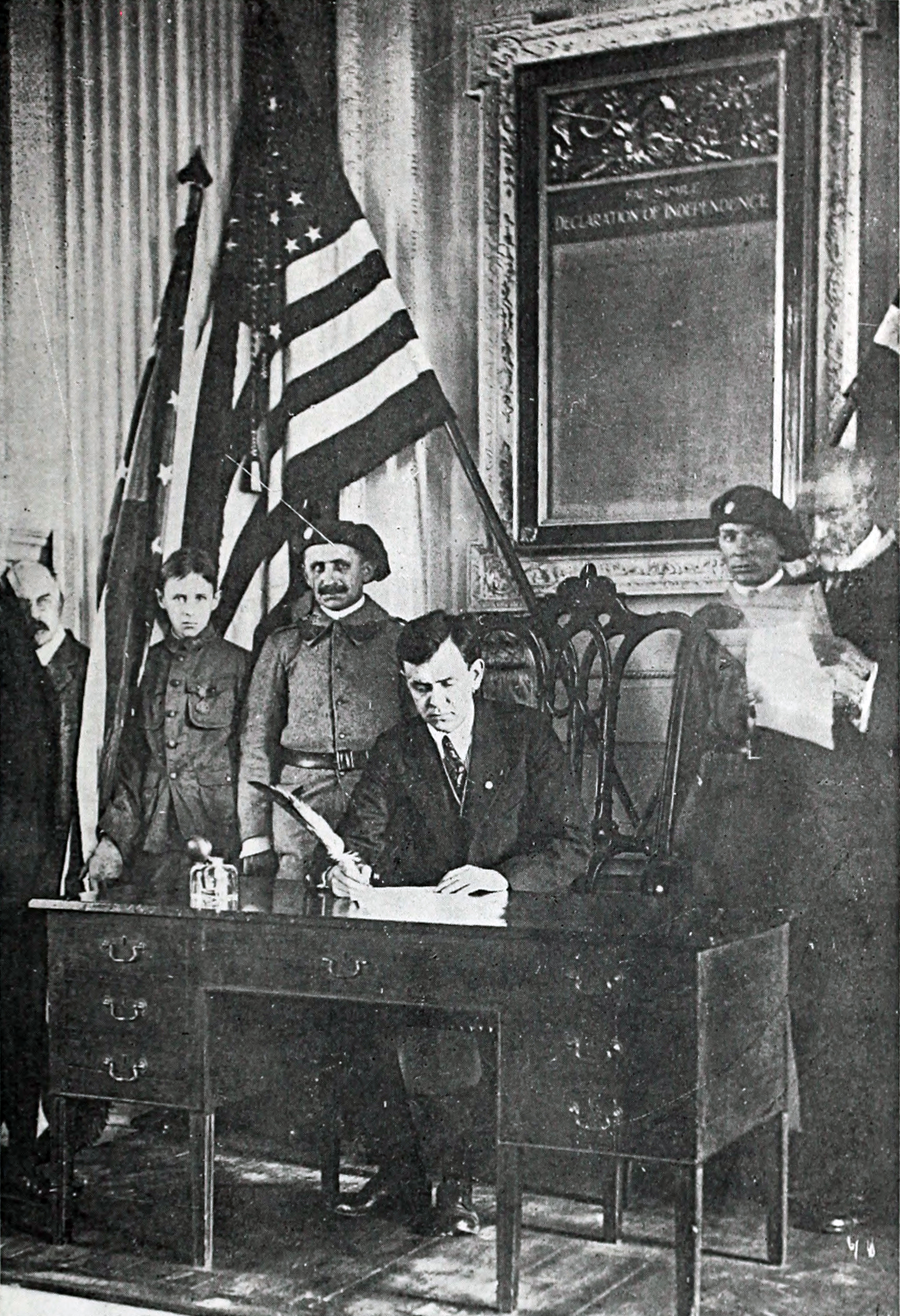
Gregory Žatkovich signing the Mid-European Union Declaration of Common Aims in Independence Hall, Philadelphia, 1919

After the defeat of Austria-Hungary in the First World War, as part of Wilson's fourteen points plan to secure peace in Europe, point ten called for "The people of Austria-Hungary, whose place among the nations we wish to see safeguarded and assured, should be accorded the freest opportunity to autonomous development."

One month prior to the declaration of Czechoslovak independence, on September 3, 1918, Secretary of State Robert Lansing announced that the United States recognized the Czechoslovak National Council, which resided in Paris as a de facto government at war with the German and Austro-Hungarian Empires and that it was prepared to enter into formal relations with it. On November 12 Assistant Secretary of State William Phillips announced that the United States recognized Charles Pergler as the Czecho-Slovak National Council's Commissioner in Washington establishing formal relations between the two countries.

On April 23, 1919, Richard Teller Crane II was appointed as the American ambassador to Czechoslovakia. He presented his credentials on June 11 and served until December 5, 1921. On October 24, 1919, Foreign Minister Edvard Beneš announced the appointment of Jan Masaryk, son of President Tomáš Masaryk, as Chargé d’Affaires in Washington. Masaryk was officially received by Secretary of State Robert Lansing on December 8, 1920. Bedrich Stepanek presented his credentials on January 5, 1921, when he was appointed ambassador on behalf of Czechoslovakia.

On October 29, 1923, both countries signed a commercial relations treaty in Prague. The treaty entered force on November 5. It was supplanted by a reciprocal trade agreement signed in Washington on March 7, 1938. It entered into force provisionally on April 16, 1938, but was terminated on April 22, 1939.

Due to the United States' investment and involvement in Czechoslovakia's independence and its support for the government in exile, Czechoslovakia owed one hundred and ten million dollars. The country was seventh on the list of the World War Foreign Debts Commission Act. Loans given by the U.S included American Relief Administration supplies, repatriation of the Legionaries from Russia, purchases of military materials, and accrued interest. Czechoslovakia recognized the majority of its debts to America but tried to negotiate a more favorable position regarding repayment of the loans Negotiations lasted for a few years and finished in 1925 when the State Department blocked negotiations between Czech and American financial representatives over new loans and credits. As a result, Czechoslovakia was forced to sign the debt agreement which provided a 62-year term of payment and a total of three hundred and twelve million. This allowed for further American investment in the country. Issue of the debt and its payment wouldn't occur again until Franklin D. Roosevelt's administration which tried to work new agreements for the full payment of the debts but all payments stopped in 1934 during which Czechoslovakia paid twenty million. The issue was raised again in 1937 when the Czechoslovak government showed interest in new loans and with their intent to start new discussions on an agreement. But with looming conflict with Nazi Germany, all talks ended with the annexation of the Sudetenland and Occupation of Czechoslovakia. The U.S. Congress proposed to shift Czechoslovakia's debts to Germany but never materialized due to the high improbability of the Nazi regime's unwillingness to pay it.

=== World War Two ===
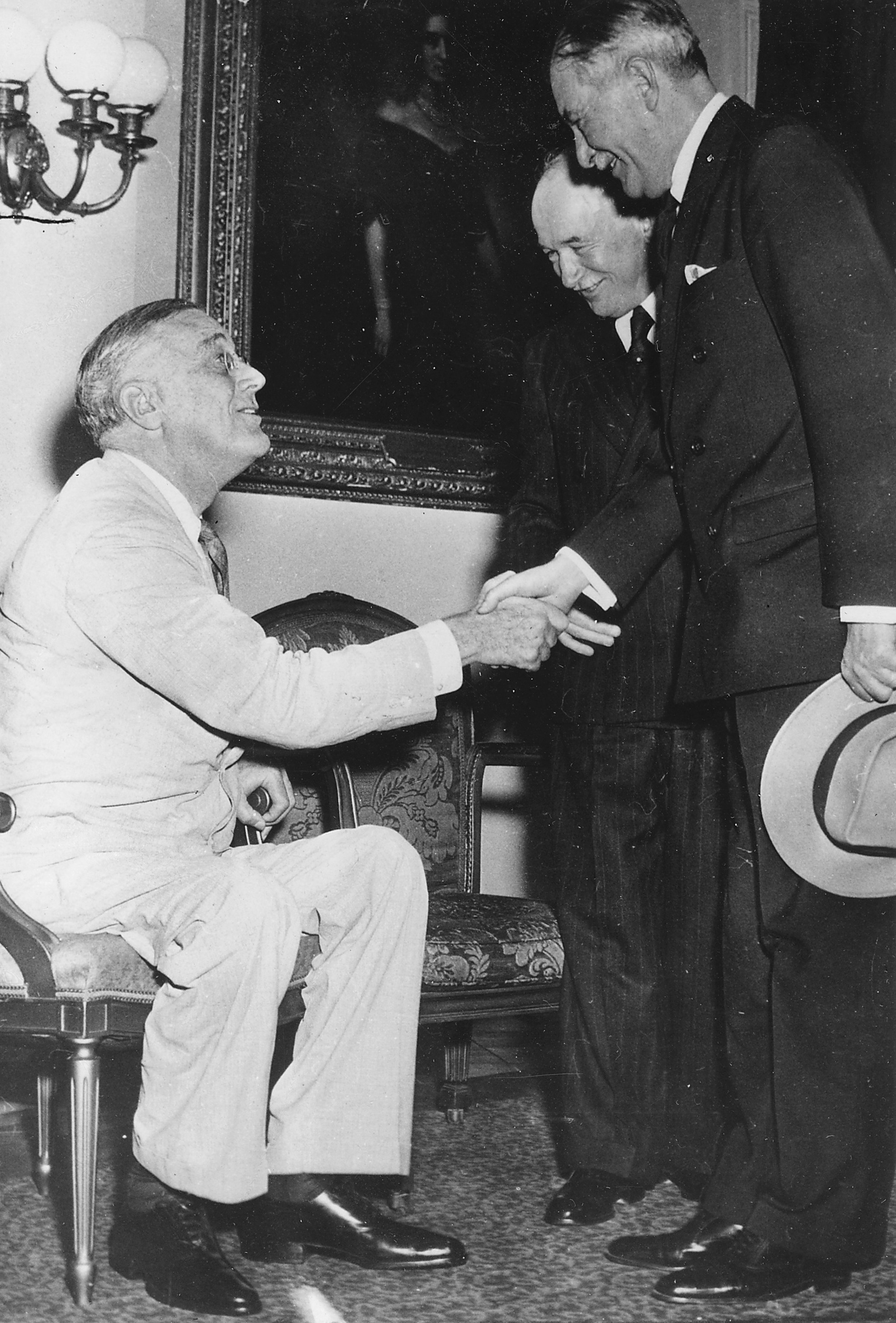
FDR shaking hands with President Edvard Beneš and ambassador Vladimír Hurban

After Germany's annexation and occupation of Czechoslovakia, the U.S. fully backed and supported the Czechoslovak government-in-exile initially operating in Paris in 1939, but withdrew to London in 1940 due to the then-impending German occupation of France. Diplomatic support did not end as a result of the occupation by Germany. The United States did not recognize the establishment of a German protectorate over Bohemia and Moravia, or the establishment of the state of Slovakia. Wilbur J. Carr, former Assistant Secretary of State and Chief of the Consular Bureau, was Minister to Czechoslovakia when German forces occupied Prague on March 15, 1939, Carr closed the Legation on March 21, and departed on April 6. Vladimir Hurban, the Czechoslovak Minister to the United States since 1936, was promoted to Ambassador and presented his new credentials on June 14, 1943.

Despite supporting the government-in-exile, the U.S. wasn't willing to support President Edvard Beneš's calls for liberation. FDR instructed the State Department to tell Beneš "not come to Washington at this time nor ask for an appointment with him". But on May 28, 1939, for his fifty-fifth birthday, Roosevelt invited Beneš to his home in Hyde Park, New York. Beneš nevertheless put forward the idea of organizing a provisional government and military forces. Roosevelt only showed sympathy resulting in no action to implement such an idea. The reason was not to give direct and public support for an anti-German struggle in America, believing such a decision of non-recognition of Munich and saving Czechoslovak Legation was enough. Beneš was satisfied with this policy and the president's comment to recognize the Czechoslovak government in exile when the time came. But this was also in accordance with the American general public who did not want the country involved in what they viewed as simply a European conflict that had nothing to do with the U.S.

American position would change as a result in July 1941, after the German invasion of the Soviet Union, London and Moscow gave full de jure recognition to Beneš as president-in-exile. On 30 July, Roosevelt in a personal message to Beneš informed him of the decision to establish a permanent relationship with Beneš as a "president of the provisional Czechoslovak government" through ambassador Anthony Joseph Drexel Biddle Jr. But the official de jure recognition of Beneš as a president of Czechoslovakia followed only in October 1942 after the U.S. entered the war after the Attack on Pearl Harbor on December 7, 1941. On September 4, 1941, Biddle was appointed Minister to the Czechoslovak Government in London. He presented his credentials on October 28. Biddle was also commissioned to the governments-in-exile of Belgium, Greece, Luxembourg, the Netherlands, Norway, Poland, and Yugoslavia. Biddle was promoted to Ambassador on June 4, 1943, and presented his new credentials on July 12. He left London on December 1, 1943.

Regardless of the recognition of Beneš's government, the U.S. still showed little interest in the Protectorate and Slovakia. Beneš also sought American support before his visit to the Soviet Union in December 1943. In Moscow, Beneš intended to sign a treaty of friendship with the Soviet government. Beneš wanted to use the United States as a counterweight to Soviet influence in accordance with his post-war foreign policy program – reliance on new allies against Germany (instead of France and the UK, responsible for the Munich borders) and equal orientation to the West and the East.

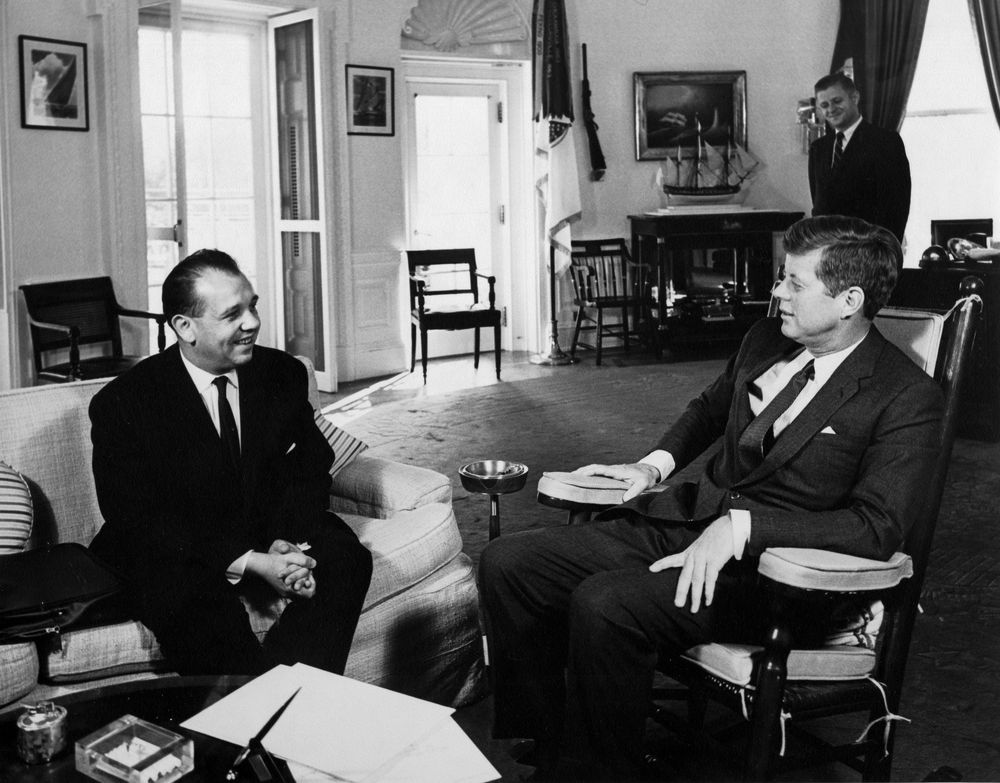
President John F. Kennedy with ambassador Karel Duda in the Oval Office on November 13, 1963

Beneš visited the U.S. again from May 8 to June 9, 1943, addressing Congress and holding meetings with the Secretary of State, politicians, public figures, and Czech and Slovak community leaders. But once again this did not muster any significant support for Beneš's cause. Beneš would get larger military support from the Soviets as the USSR was the only country in the Allied membership to liberate Czechoslovakia from Nazi control. On 8 May 1944, Beneš signed an agreement with Soviet leaders stipulating that "Czechoslovak territory liberated by Soviet armies" would be placed under Czechoslovak civilian control.

In early 1945 Soviet forces began liberating eastern parts of the country eventually culminating in the Prague offensive from May 6 to 11, 1945, resulting in Czechoslovakia's complete liberation. The State Department's Division of Central European Affairs in its memorandum of 11 January 1945 stated that "the Czechoslovak government's relations with the British and Soviet governments are excellent, and present no problems. Czechoslovak-American relations remain excellent, as they have been in the past." Beneš returned to the Soviet Union in March reaching new agreements about the government structure and post-war political orientation of Czechoslovakia giving important positions in the coalition People's front government was given to communists, and others belonged to the democratic parties. In Košice, the Czechoslovak government announced its program of post-war development on 5 April 1945, which presupposed socialist reforms and closer relations with the USSR.

On May 29, 1945, the American legation in Prague was upgraded to an embassy with Alfred W. Klieforth as Chargé d’Affaires ad interim. Laurence Steinhardt was appointed as the first U.S. Ambassador to Czechoslovakia on December 20, 1944. He presented his credentials on July 20, 1945, and served until September 19, 1948.

On January 3, 1946, both nations signed an agreement that dealt with air transport services which entered into force on June 17, 1946.

=== Communist period ===
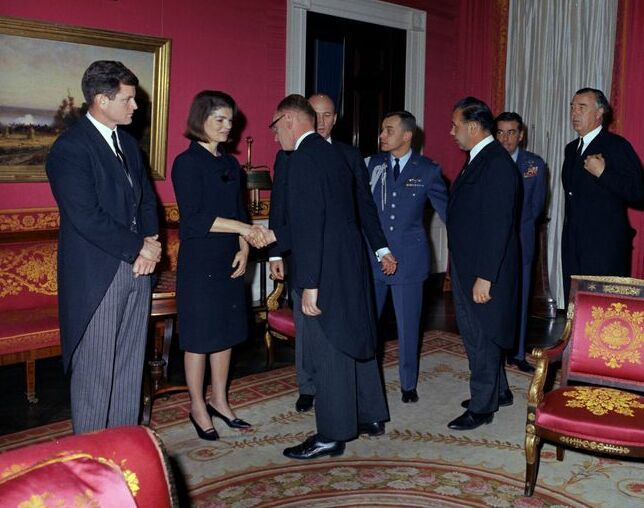
Jacqueline Kennedy and Ted Kennedy greeting Jiří Hájek, Karel Duda, Prince Bertil of Sweden, Tage Erlander, Olof Palme, Angier Biddle Duke, and Brigadier General Godfrey McHugh in the Red Room after President Kennedy's funeral, November 25, 1963

As a result of the U.S.'s lack of full support to Czechoslovak during the Second World War, communist and Soviet influence grew in the country. Total control of the country under the communists took place with the 1948 coup d'état which resulted in four decades under the name of the Czechoslovak Socialist Republic. Relations soon became strained and were practically frozen and non-existent.

The United States opened a Consulate General in Bratislava, now the current embassy to Slovakia, in 1947. It was closed in 1950 after the Communist Government alleged that U.S. diplomatic personnel were engaged in espionage and other improper activities, and demanded a reduction in their numbers.

On November 13, 1963, Karel Duda, the ambassador to the U.S. met with President John F. Kennedy to discuss efforts to improve trade between the two countries. Two months earlier, Luther H. Hodges, the Secretary of Commerce visited Czechoslovakia from September 8–9.

Karel Duda and Jiří Hájek, Czechoslovakia's ambassador to the United Nations, attended the state funeral of John F. Kennedy on November 25, 1963. During the reception, he met with Jacqueline Kennedy and Ted Kennedy.

The Soviet invasion of Czechoslovakia in August 1968 further complicated U.S.-Czechoslovak relations. The United States referred the matter to the United Nations Security Council as a violation of the United Nations Charter requesting an emergency session, but no action was taken against the Soviets or the other members of the Warsaw Pact. Reasons for the invasion were the Soviets were concerned about the possibility of losing a regional ally and buffer state, the United States did not publicly seek an alliance with the Czechoslovak government. President Lyndon B. Johnson had already involved the United States in the Vietnam War and was unlikely to be able to drum up support for a conflict in Czechoslovakia. Also, he wanted to pursue an arms control treaty with the Soviets, SALT. He needed a willing partner in Moscow to reach such an agreement, and he did not wish to risk that treaty over what was ultimately a minor conflict in Czechoslovakia. For these reasons, the United States stated that it would not intervene on behalf of the Prague Spring. Johnson would cancel a summit with Soviet leader Leonid Brezhnev as a result of the invasion.

On July 9, 1973, both countries signed a consular treaty. The treaty would not enter into force until November 6, 1987.

On January 29, 1982, an agreement was signed on the Settlement of Certain Outstanding Claims and Financial Issues.

=== Velvet Revolution ===
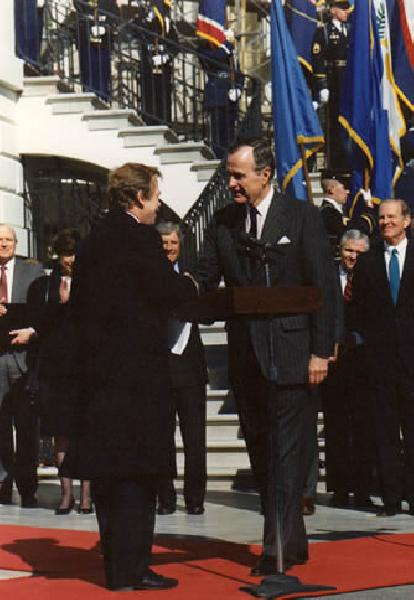
George H. W. Bush with Václav Havel during a reception for the latter's visit on February 20, 1990

In 1989 the Velvet Revolution broke out on November 17 which were demonstrations against the one-party government of the Communist Party of Czechoslovakia included students and older dissidents. The U.S. supported the revolution led by the efforts of the penultimate ambassador Shirley Temple. Temple met with students and dissidents during the protests and helped prevent a violent crackdown by Czechoslovak authorities. She also took the unusual step of personally accompanying Václav Havel, the last president of Czechoslovakia and one of the leaders of the revolution, on his first official visit to Washington, traveling on the same plane with him. According to Temple, her work after the revolution shifted more to economic matters. But she had protested against laws that would have barred ex-communists from holding government positions and was troubled by talks of the country splitting into two countries.

Havel visited the U.S. from February 19 to 21, 1990, meeting with George H. W. Bush on the twentieth. On the twenty-first Havel addressed a joint session of Congress. Havel would visit the U.S. two more times. The first was on September 30 during the U.N. General Assembly meeting Bush again. The second was from October 21 to 24, 1991 during a visit to Los Angeles giving the Tanner Lecture on Human Values at University of California, Los Angeles on the twenty-fifth. The last and meeting between leaders of both countries came with Prime Minister Marián Čalfa meeting with Bush on April 10, 1992. The only visit by an American president to Czechoslovakia was when George H. W. Bush visited Prague on November 17, 1990, to commemorate the first anniversary of the Velvet Revolution and addressed the Federal Assembly.

A treaty concerning the reciprocal encouragement and protection of investment between the transitional state of the Czech and Slovak Federative Republic and the U.S. was signed on October 22, 1991. It entered into force December 19, 1992, and has continued into force with the successor states of the Czech Republic and Slovakia.

The result of the revolution was the end of 41 years of one-party rule in Czechoslovakia and the subsequent dismantling of the command economy and conversion to a parliamentary republic. Ultimately leading to a transition state of the Czech and Slovak Federative Republic leading to the establishment of modern-day Czech Republic and Slovakia where relations have continued with the United States and have been very close.

== See also ==
- Foreign relations of the United States
- Ambassadors of Czechoslovakia to the United States
- Ambassadors of the United States to Czechoslovakia
- Embassy of the United States, Prague
- Czech Republic–United States relations
- Slovakia–United States relations
