= Ryukyu Kingdom–United States relations =

- Ryukyu: United States

The Ryukyu Kingdom and the United States formally recognized each other in 1857, but never formally established diplomatic relations. Since the Kingdom was a tributary state to China, formal relations could only be conducted by both China and Japan. The relationship between both countries were merely economic as the U.S. much like its European counterparts were interested in establishing trade routes accessing the Kingdom's ports.

== History ==
On July 11, 1854, U.S. Commodore Matthew C. Perry signed the Convention between the Lew Chew Islands and the United States of America with the Kingdom which stipulated "Hereafter, whenever Citizens of the United States come to Lew Chew, they shall be treated with great courtesy and friendship. Whatever Articles these persons ask for, whether from the officers or people, which the Country can furnish, shall be sold to them; nor shall the authorities interpose any prohibitory regulations to the people selling, and whatever either party may wish to buy shall be exchanged at reasonable prices." The price for hiring U.S. vessels out of the harbor were set at five dollars.

Following the signing of the treaty, the Japanese government had been making inroads toward taking control of the islands that now constitute the Okinawa Prefecture. Japan had instituted that all business by foreign governments pertaining to Ryukyu be conducted through the Japanese Department of Foreign Affairs. The position of the United States was that the independence of the islands "was a disputed matter in which the United States could not interfere unless its rights under treaty stipulations with any of the powers concerned in the controversy be endangered." The question was resolved in 1879 when Japan took control of the islands overthrowing the Kingdom ending all relations between the now-former Kingdom and the United States.

== See also ==
- Foreign relations of the United States
- Japan–United States relations
