= Central African Republic–United States relations =

Bilateral relations between The united states and Central African Republic

Central African Republic–United States relations are the international relations between the Central African Republic and the United States of America. The relations have generally been positive, although concerns over the pace of political and economic liberalization and human rights have affected the degree of support provided by the United States to the Central African Republic.

== History ==
The United States and the Central African Republic established diplomatic relations on August 13, 1960.

The U.S. Embassy in Bangui was briefly closed as a result of the 1996-97 mutinies. It reopened in 1998 with limited staff, but U.S. Agency for International Development (USAID) and Peace Corps missions previously operating in Bangui did not return. The American Embassy in Bangui again temporarily suspended operations on November 2, 2002, in response to security concerns raised by the October 2002 launch of François Bozizé's 2003 military coup.

The Embassy reopened in January 2005; however, there were limited U.S. diplomatic/consular representation in the C.A.R. As a result, the ability of the Embassy to provide services to American citizens remained extremely limited. The Department of State approved the lifting of Section 508 aid restrictions triggered by the coup; U.S. assistance to the Central African Republic had been prohibited except in the areas of humanitarian aid and support for democratization.

On December 27, 2012, the US closed its embassy in the Central African Republic and removed its diplomats due to rising violence from the rebellion in the country. Two years later, in September of 2014, the US reopened its embassy and resumed normal operations.

As of October 2026, the United States ambassador to the Central African Republic is Melanie Anne Zimmerman; the Central African ambassador to the United States is Martial Ndoubou.

== Third Country Removal Agreement ==
On April 4, 2026, the Central African Republic signed a third country removal agreement with the United States, which allows the United States to deport third country nationals and asylum seekers, who cannot be sent back to their home countries, to the Central African Republic. Individuals sent back include those who hold U.S. court protections against repatration to their home countries.

This agreement followed the approval of an $85 million USD government funding budget for the International Organization for Migration's operations in the Central African Republic. This decision has been widely criticised by human rights groups due to the ongoing civil war and human rights crisis in the Central African Republic.

As of September 10th, 2026, 92 third country nationals have been sent to the Central African Republic.

== Resident diplomatic missions ==
- Central African Republic has an embassy in Washington, D.C.
- United States has an embassy in Bangui

== Gallery ==
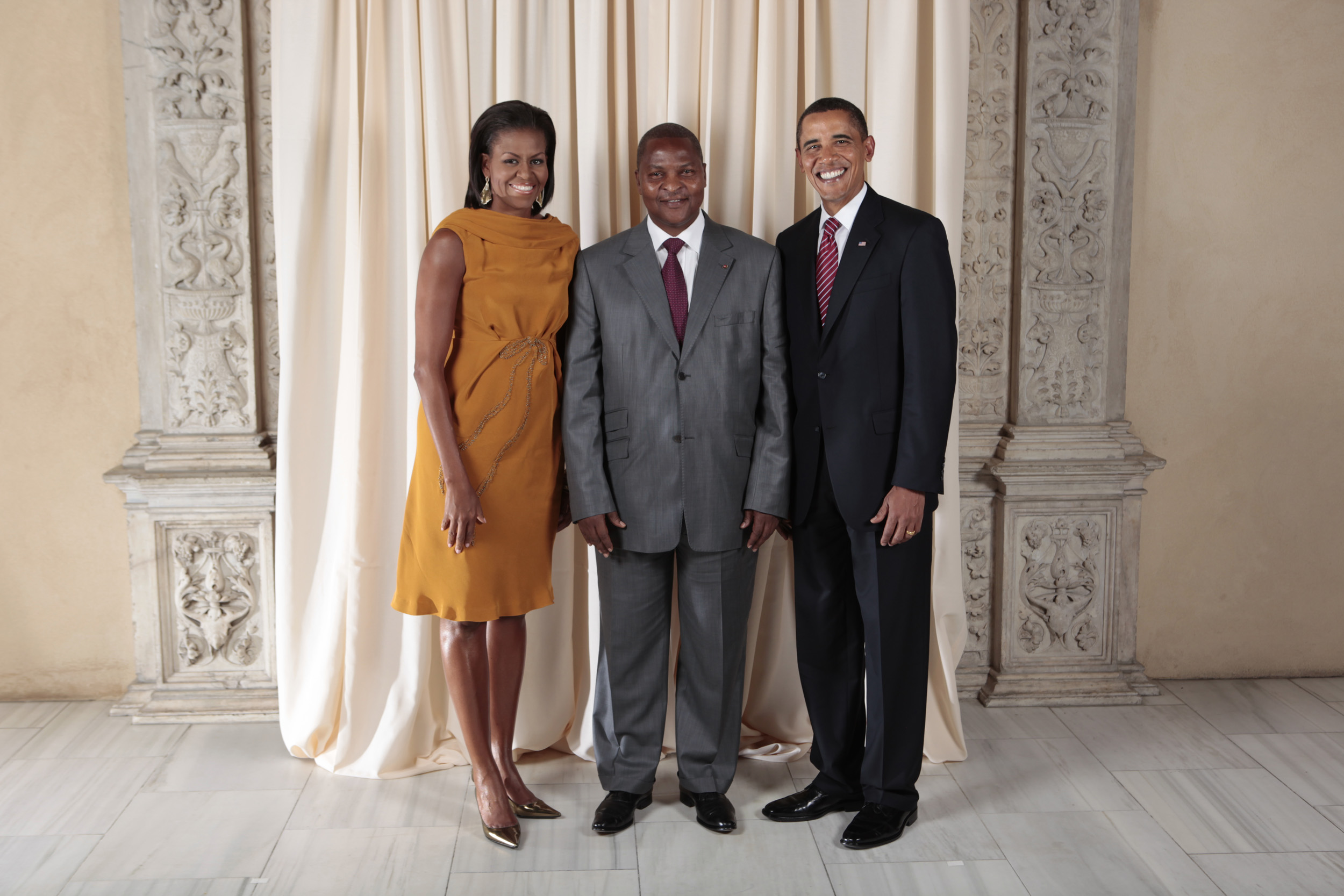
Barack Obama and First Lady Michelle Obama with Faustin-Archange Touadéra at a 2009 reception in New York City.

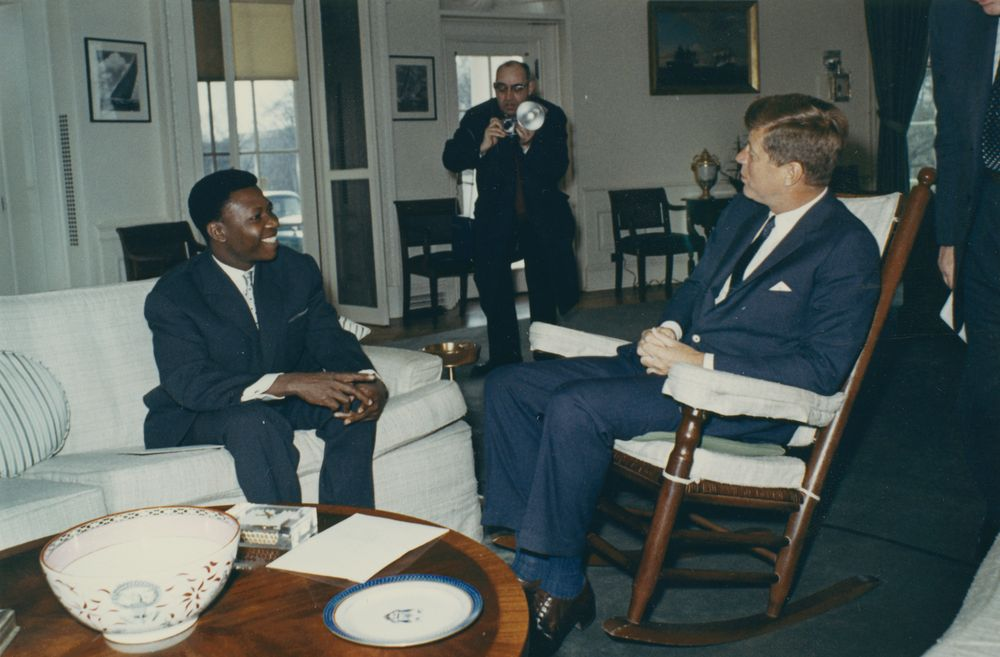
Jean-Pierre Kombet, the Central African Republic's ambassador to the U.S. meeting with President Kennedy, 1962

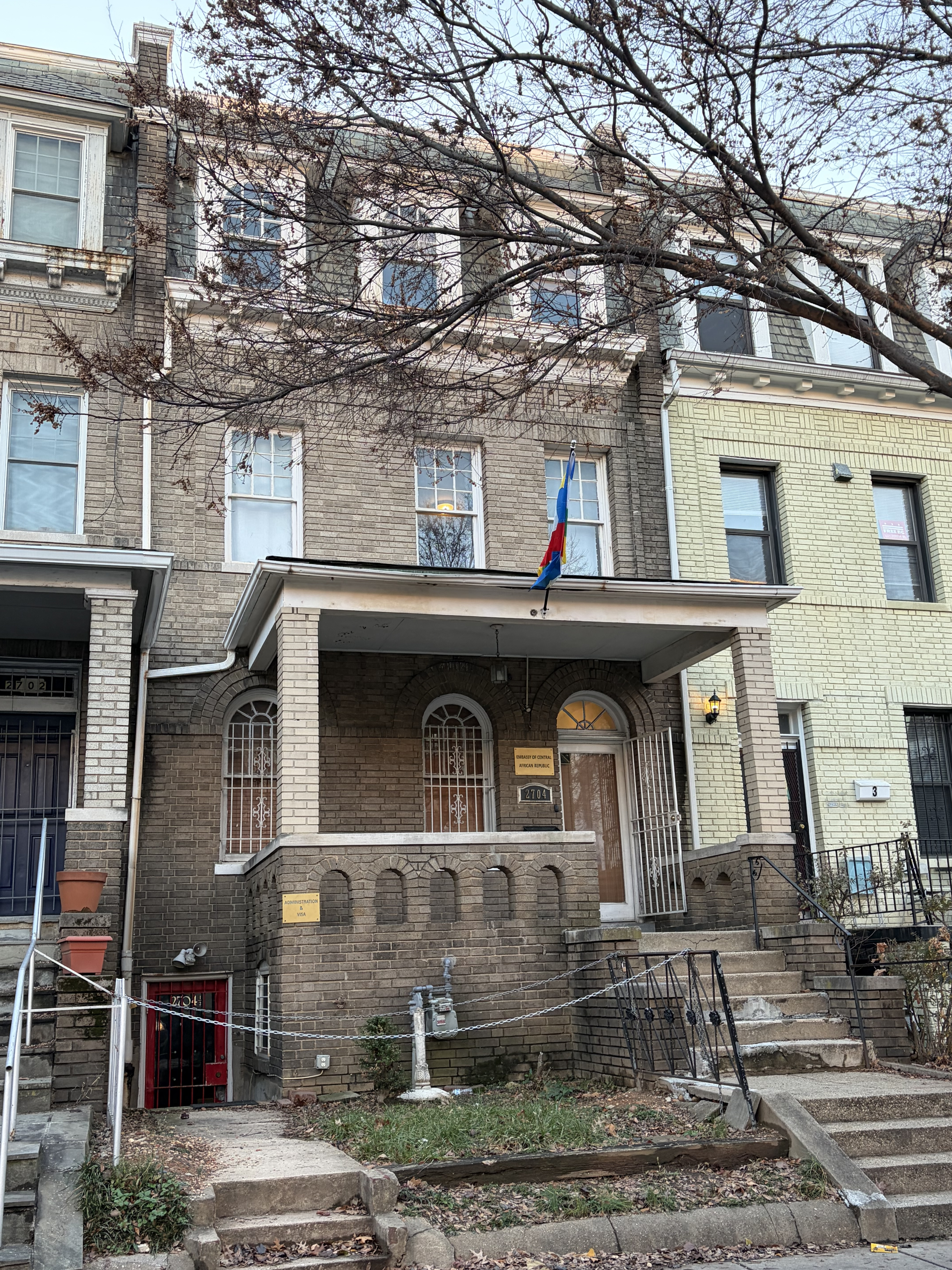
Embassy of the Central African Republic in Washington, D.C.
