= Cayman Islands–United States relations =

- Cayman Islands: United States

Cayman Islands–United States relations are bilateral relations between the Cayman Islands, an overseas territory of the United Kingdom of Great Britain and Northern Ireland, and the United States of America.

== Overview ==
Although the United Kingdom is responsible for the Cayman Islands' defence and external affairs, important bilateral issues are often resolved by negotiations between the Cayman Government and foreign governments, including the United States. Despite close historic and political links to the U.K. and Jamaica, geography and the rise of tourism and international finance in the Cayman Islands' economy has made the United States its most important foreign economic partner. Following a decline in tourists from the United States after the September 11, 2001 attacks, over 200,000 U.S. citizens travelled by air to the Cayman Islands in 2004; 4,761 Americans were resident there as of 2005.

For U.S. and other foreign investors and businesses, the Cayman Islands' main appeal as a financial centre is the absence of all major direct taxes, free capital movement, minimal government regulations, and a well-developed financial infrastructure.

With the rise in international narcotics trafficking, the Cayman Government entered into the Narcotics Agreement of 1984 and the Mutual Legal Assistance Treaty of 1986 with the United States in order to reduce the use of its facilities for money laundering operations. In June 2000, the Cayman Islands was listed by multilateral organisations as a tax haven and a non-cooperative territory in fighting money laundering. The country's swift response in enacting laws limiting banking secrecy, introducing requirements for customer identification and record keeping, and for banks to cooperate with foreign investigators led to its removal from the list of non-cooperative territories in June 2001.

== U.S. representation ==
The United States does not maintain diplomatic offices in the Cayman Islands. Diplomatic relations are conducted through the U.S. Embassy in London and the British Embassy in Washington, D.C.

The Cayman Islands are, however, part of the consular district administered by the U.S. Embassy in Kingston, Jamaica. There also is a U.S. Consular Agency in George Town on Grand Cayman to assist in providing services for American citizens.
