= Mozambique–United States relations =

- Mozambique: United States

Mozambique–United States relations are bilateral relations between Mozambique and the United States.

== History ==
The United States established diplomatic recognition of the People's Republic of Mozambique on June 25, 1975, following Mozambique's independence from Portuguese colonial rule. Formal diplomatic relations between the United States and Mozambique commenced on September 23, 1975, with the signing of a joint communiqué by Secretary of State Henry Kissinger and Mozambican Foreign Minister Joachim Alberto Chissano. The U.S. Embassy in Maputo was established on November 8, 1975, with Johnnie Carson as the initial Chargé d'Affaires ad interim.

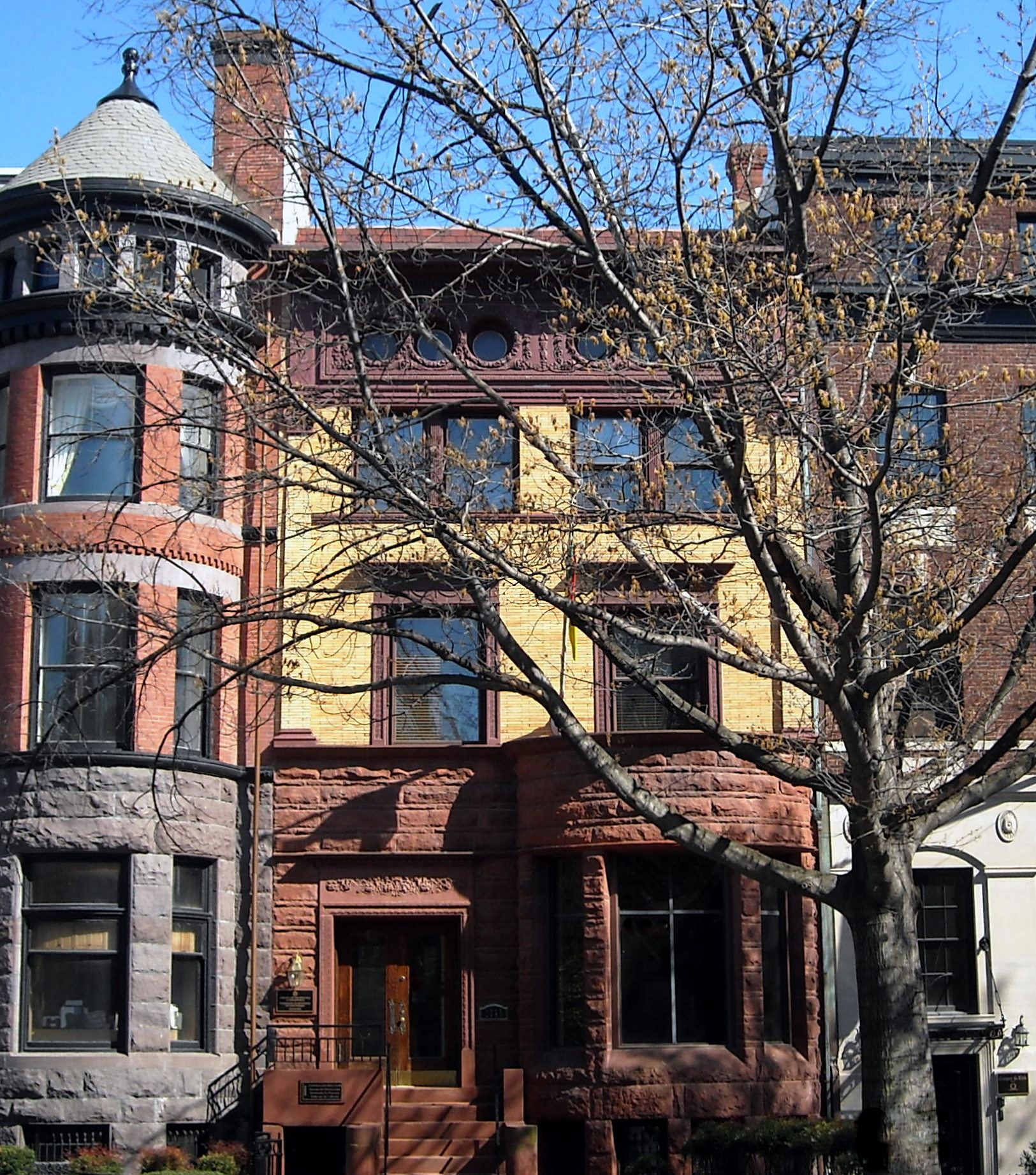
Embassy of Mozambique in Washington, D.C.

Relations between the United States and Mozambique are good and steadily improving. Besides Madagascar, Mozambique was the only East African country to be involved in importing African slaves to the Americas. By 1993, U.S. aid to Mozambique was prominent, due in part to significant emergency food assistance in the wake of the 1991-93 southern African drought, but more important in support of the peace and reconciliation process. During the process leading up to elections in October 1994, the United States served as a significant financier and member of the most important commissions established to monitor implementation of the Rome General Peace Accords. The United States is the largest bilateral donor to the country and plays a leading role in donor efforts to assist Mozambique.

The U.S. Embassy opened in Maputo on November 8, 1975, and the first American ambassador arrived in March 1976. In that same year, the United States extended a $10 million grant to the Government of Mozambique to help compensate for the economic costs of enforcing sanctions against Rhodesia. In 1977, however, largely motivated by a concern with human rights violations, the U.S. Congress prohibited the provision of development aid to Mozambique without a presidential certification that such aid would be in the foreign policy interests of the United States. Relations hit a nadir in March 1981, when the Government of Mozambique expelled four members of the U.S. Embassy staff. In response, the United States suspended plans to provide development aid and to name a new ambassador to Mozambique. Relations between the two countries languished in a climate of stagnation and mutual suspicion.

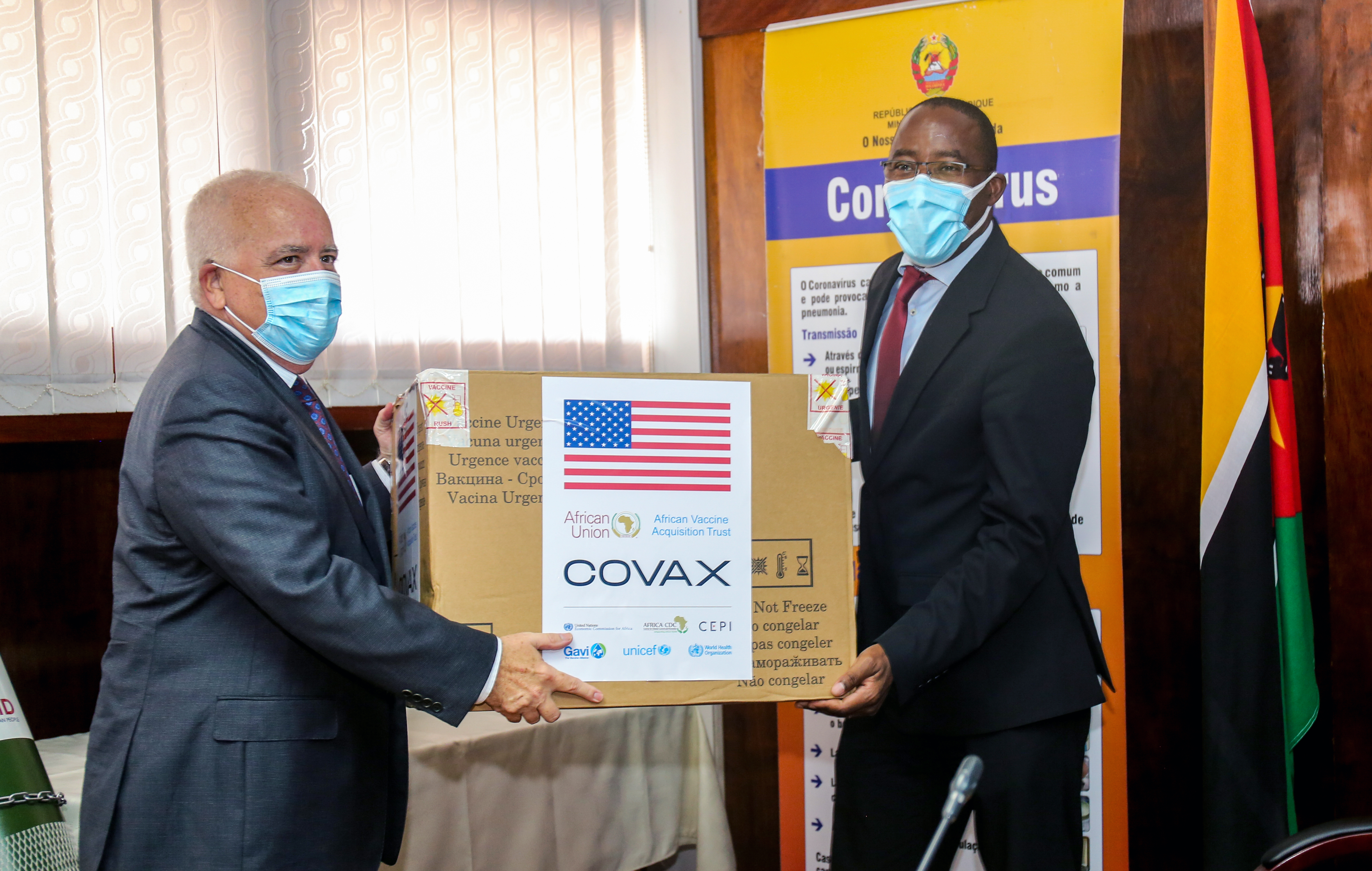
The US delivers COVID-19 vaccines to Mozambique in 2021 as part of the COVAX program

Contacts between the two countries continued in the early 1980s as part of the U.S. administration's conflict resolution efforts in the region. In late 1983, a new U.S. ambassador arrived in Maputo, and the first Mozambican envoy to the United States arrived in Washington, signaling a thaw in the bilateral relationship. The United States subsequently responded to Mozambique's economic reform and drift away from Moscow's embrace by initiating an aid program in 1984. President of Mozambique Samora Machel paid a symbolically important official working visit to the United States in 1985, where he met U.S. President Ronald Reagan. After that meeting, a full U.S. Agency for International Development (USAID) mission was established, and significant assistance for economic reform efforts began. President Joaquim Chissano met with President George W. Bush in September 2003; previously, he had met with Presidents Reagan (October 1987), Bush (March 1990), and Bill Clinton (November 1998), and also with Secretaries of State Colin Powell (February 2002) and James Baker (July 1992). Since taking office in February 2005, President Armando Guebuza has visited the United States on five occasions. In June 2005, President Guebuza visited Washington, D.C., to take part in President Bush's mini-summit on Africa, along with the leaders of Ghana, Namibia, Botswana, and Niger. Later that month, he attended the Corporate Council on Africa (CCA) Business Summit in Baltimore. President Guebuza returned in September 2005 for the United Nations General Assembly in New York and in December 2005 attended the Fourth Development Cooperation Forum at the Carter Center in Atlanta. In 2006, he visited New York for the UN General Assembly, and in 2007 he visited Washington, D.C. for the signing of Mozambique's Millennium Challenge Corporation compact.

== Aid ==
Since Mozambique's independence, the United States has provided aid to Mozambique, with increased assistance following the floods in 2000. This aid has focused on health, agriculture, and democratic governance, totaling over $6 billion since 1984. A significant portion of this aid has been allocated for HIV and AIDS relief through the President's Emergency Plan for AIDS Relief (PEPFAR) program. Other U.S. programs in Mozambique include the Peace Corps, the Feed the Future Initiative, the President's Malaria Initiative, and the Global Climate Change Initiative. The Millennium Challenge Corporation (MCC) Compact, which ended in 2013, allocated approximately $448 million for Mozambique's development.

In 2025 HIV testing became unavailable in most regions of Mozambique, as a result of USAID funding stoppage, according to the United Nations. Additionally, community workers, educators, and counselors involved in projects funded by the U.S. President’s Emergency Plan for AIDS Relief have ceased receiving payments, impacting efforts to combat the epidemic. The cuts to USAID by the Trump administration have badly affected northern Mozambique’s Cabo Delgado region, weakening development and anti-extremism programs and coinciding with a new surge in Islamic State-linked insurgent activity especially in areas of Mocímboa da Praia — displacing civilians.
