= Republic of the Congo–United States relations =

- Congo: United States

Republic of the Congo–United States relations are the international relations between the Republic of the Congo and the United States of America.

The Republic of the Congo was recognized by the United States on the day of its independence, 15 August 1960. Diplomatic relations between the United States and Congo were broken during the most radical Congolese-Marxist period, 1965–77. The U.S. Embassy reopened in 1977 with the restoration of relations, which remained distant until the end of the socialist era. The late 1980s were marked by a progressive warming of Congolese relations with Western countries, including the United States. Congolese President Denis Sassou-Nguesso made a state visit to Washington in 1990, where he was received by President George H. W. Bush.

== History ==
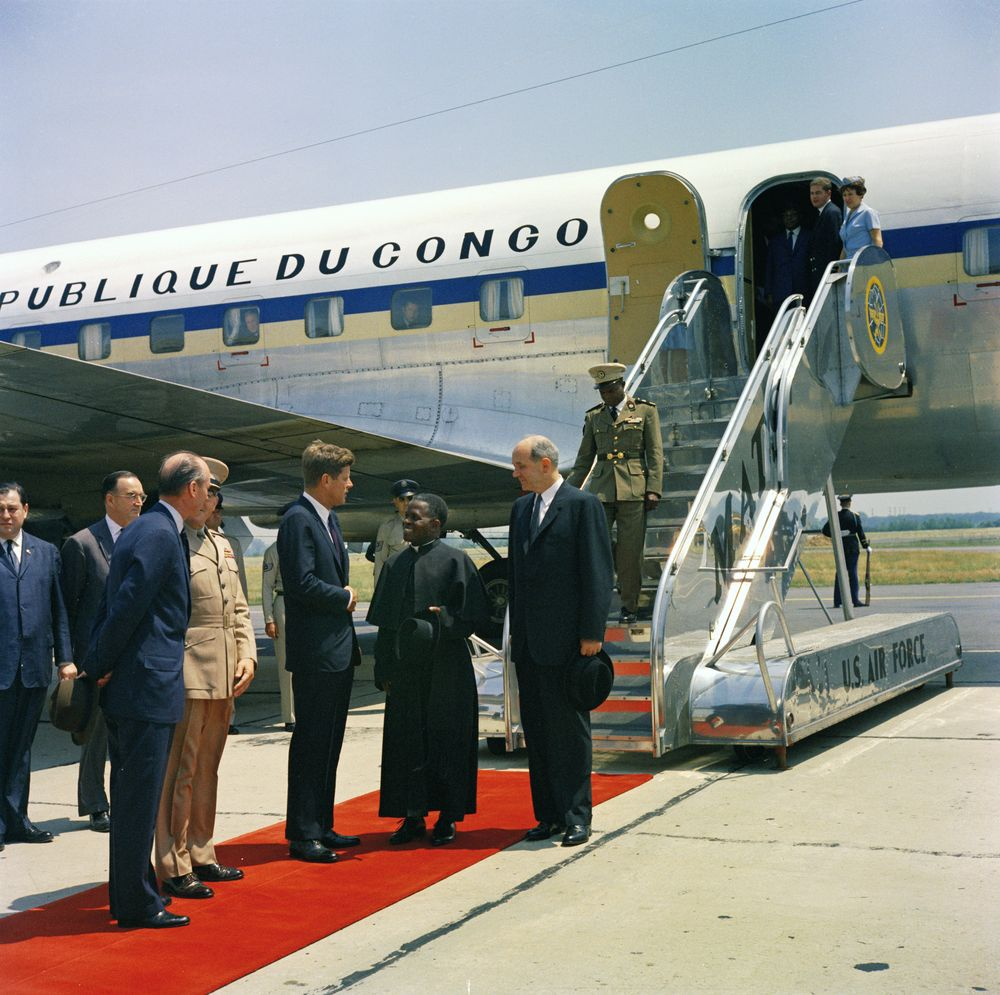
President John F. Kennedy welcoming President Fulbert Youlou to the U.S. shortly after the Congo's independence, June 1961

The U.S. recognized Congo's independence in 1960 and Congo's first president, Fulbert Youlou, was invited to the U.S. on an official state visit in 1961. Emmanuel Damongo-Dadet served as the first Congolese Ambassador to the United States during the early 1960s. Relations soured following the coup of August 15, 1963 that brought Alphonse Massamba-Débat's Soviet backed regime to power.

With the advent of democracy in 1991, Congo's relations with the United States improved and were cooperative. The United States has supported Congolese democratization efforts, contributing aid to the country's electoral process. The Congolese Government demonstrated an active interest in deepening and broadening its relations with the United States. Transition Prime Minister Andre Milongo made an official visit to Washington in 1992, where President Bush received him at the White House.

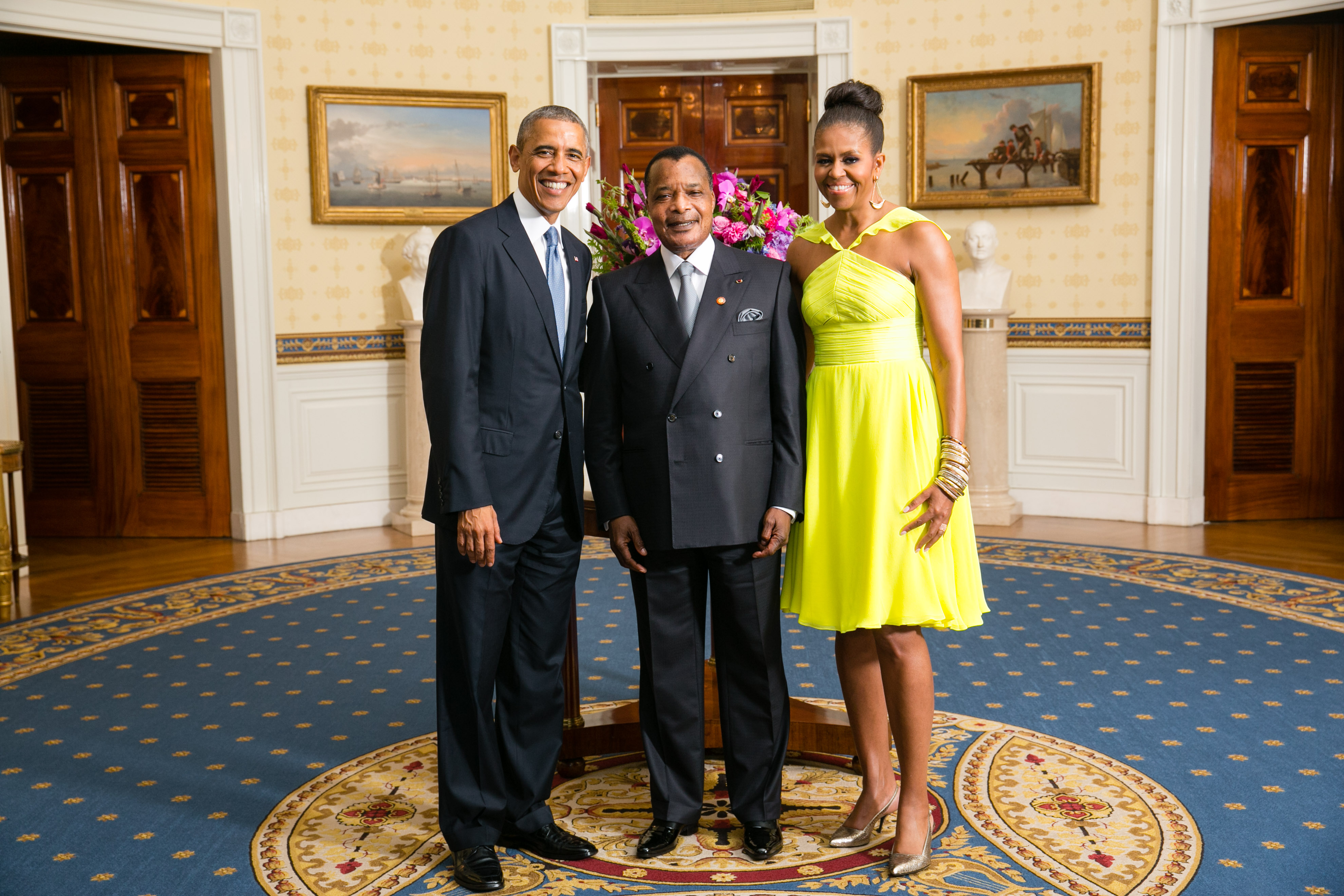
U.S. President Barack Obama, First Lady Michelle Obama and Congolese President Sassou Nguesso at the White House in 2014

Then-presidential candidate Pascal Lissouba travelled to Washington in 1992, meeting with officials, including Assistant Secretary of State for African Affairs Herman J. Cohen. After his election in August 1992, President Lissouba expressed interest in expanding U.S.–Congo links, seeking increased U.S. development aid, university exchanges, and greater U.S. investment in Congo. With the outbreak of the second civil war in 1997, the U.S. Embassy was evacuated. The embassy was closed, and its personnel became resident in Kinshasa, Democratic Republic of the Congo.

In 2001, embassy-suspended operations were lifted, and embassy personnel were allowed to travel to Brazzaville for periods of extended temporary duty from the U.S. Embassy in Kinshasa. As a result, U.S.-Congo bilateral relations were reinvigorated. In 2003 and 2004, this practice continued, and a site for construction of a new embassy was acquired in July 2004. Diplomatic activities, operations, and programs were carried out in a temporary bank location until January 2009, when a new, fully functioning embassy was opened. Relations between the United States and the government of President Denis Sassou-Nguesso are positive and cooperative.

== Diplomatic missions ==
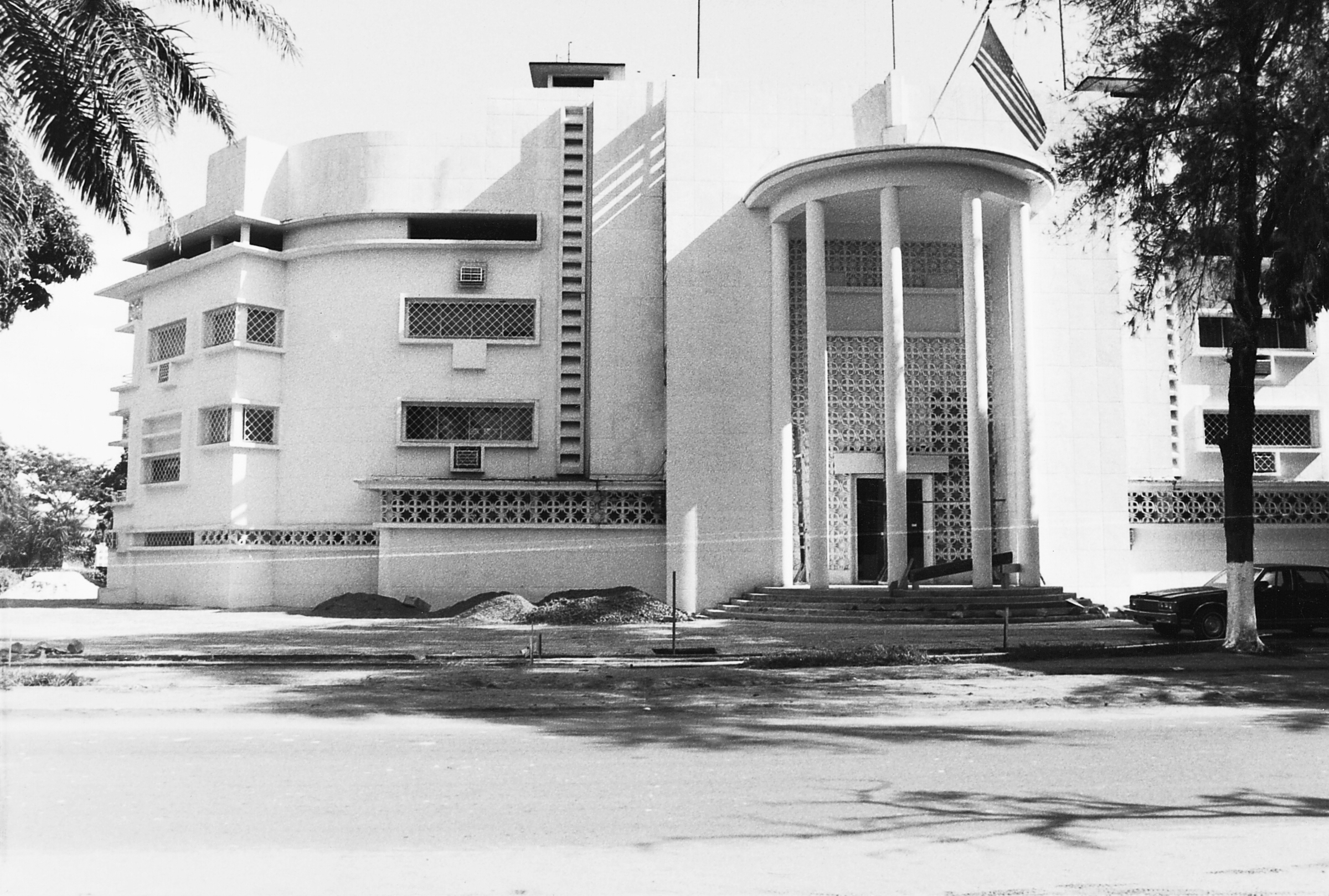
U.S. Embassy in Brazzaville, 1979

The U.S. Embassy accredited to Congo is in Brazzaville, Republic of the Congo.
