= List of ambassadors of Guinea to the United States =

Below is the list of ambassadors from Guinea to the United States:

  1. Diallo Telli (1959–61)
  2. Conté Seydou (1961–68)
  3. Karim Bangoura (1969–71)
  4. Keita Mory (1971–72)
  5. Touré Sadam Moussa (1972–74)
  6. Bah Habib (1974–76)
  7. Kouroma Daouda (1977)
  8. Camara Ibrahima (1977–79)
  9. Condé Mohamed Laminé (1979–83)
  10. Diallo Thierno Habib (1983–84)
  11. Beavogui Tollo (1984–88)
  12. Camara Kékoura (1988–90)
  13. Sangaré Moussa (1990–93)
  14. Barry Boubacar (1993–96)
  15. Thiam Mohamed Aly (1996–2001)
  16. Barry Rafiou Alpha Oumar (2002-)
  17. Blaise chérif (2011 - 2014)
  18. Mamady Condé (2014–2017)
  19. Kerfalla Yansané (2017–2022
  20. Fatoumata Kaba (2022–2025)
