= Hispanic and Latino Americans in politics =

As of the 2020 U.S. Census, 62.1 million Latinos live in the United States, representing 18.9% of the total U.S. population, a 23% increase since 2010. This racial/ethnic group is the second largest after non-Hispanic whites in the U.S. In 2020, the states with the highest Hispanic or Latino populations were: Arizona, California, Florida, Illinois, Nevada, New Jersey, New Mexico, New York, and Texas. According to the Brookings Institution, Latinos will become the nation's largest minority in 2045.

With the help of laws and court case wins, Latinos have been able to receive the help needed to participate in American politics. According to data provided by the Collaborative Multiracial Post-Election Survey (CMPS), 72% of Latinos believe that it is very or somewhat important to vote. They have traditionally been a key Democratic Party constituency, but more recently have begun to split between the Democratic and Republican Party.

Secretary of State Marco Rubio (R) is the highest-ranking Latino official in American history.

== Latinas in American Politics ==
Latinas have been involved in American political history for centuries. Dating back to 1848 with the conclusion of the U.S - Mexican War, Mexican women moved across the border to get prospective jobs, Facing challenges in working conditions, activists started unionization. In 1933, thirty-seven agricultural strikes took place in California and twenty-four strikes were led by the Cannery and Agricultural Workers Industrial Union. The 1930s was a pivotal time where Latinas in America were involved in politics. A Latina activist named Carmen Bernal Escobar made an impact as a member of the United Cannery, Agricultural, Packing, and Allied Workers of America where she negotiated significant wage increases and benefits.

The largest and oldest Hispanic and Latin American civil rights organization in the United States is the League of United Latin American Citizens (LULAC). The women apart of LULAC participated in many projects that began the uproot of this organization. Its first council #9 was created on February 22, 1934, in El Paso, Texas. By 1938, the league had created the first women's national office in Mrs. Esther Machuca as Ladies Organizer General. Women like Alicia Dickerson Montemayor and folklorist Jovita Gonzalez were actively involved in voluntarist politics and educational reform for the community. The growth of the role of women in LULAC has not stopped. Later 1981, the league's first national vice-president for women was elected. Programs for women are carried out locally through the efforts of state coordinators for women.

== Limited representation and neglect ==
=== Mexican Americans ===
Following the annexation of Northern Mexico in 1848, many Mexican who resided there as well as migrants became U.S. citizens. The treaty that allowed this for Mexicans was the Treaty of Guadalupe Hidalgo. The purpose of the treaty was to end the Mexican-American War that started in 1846. After the Mexican American war ended in 1848, the Mexicans on the U.S side of the established border became second-class citizens and they were now entitled to land and political power. However, the United States violated this treaty disregarding established Mexican-American rights.

Another pivotal movement for Mexican Americans was the Chicano Movement. In 1962, the recognition the activists in the Chicano movement brought for Hispanics were major headlines. Cesar Chavez, Dolores Huerta, Helen Chavez, and Gloria Arellanes, activists of the United Farm Workers Union, brought public attention with a series of marches, national boycotts and improved working conditions. These marches gave more recognition to Mexican-Americans and what they do for America and how they should be properly compensated. To this day after the beginning efforts of the 1800s and 1900s, Mexican Americans and all Latinos still face political exclusion in the United States' political system with restrictive voting laws and disinformation campaigns.

=== Puerto Ricans ===
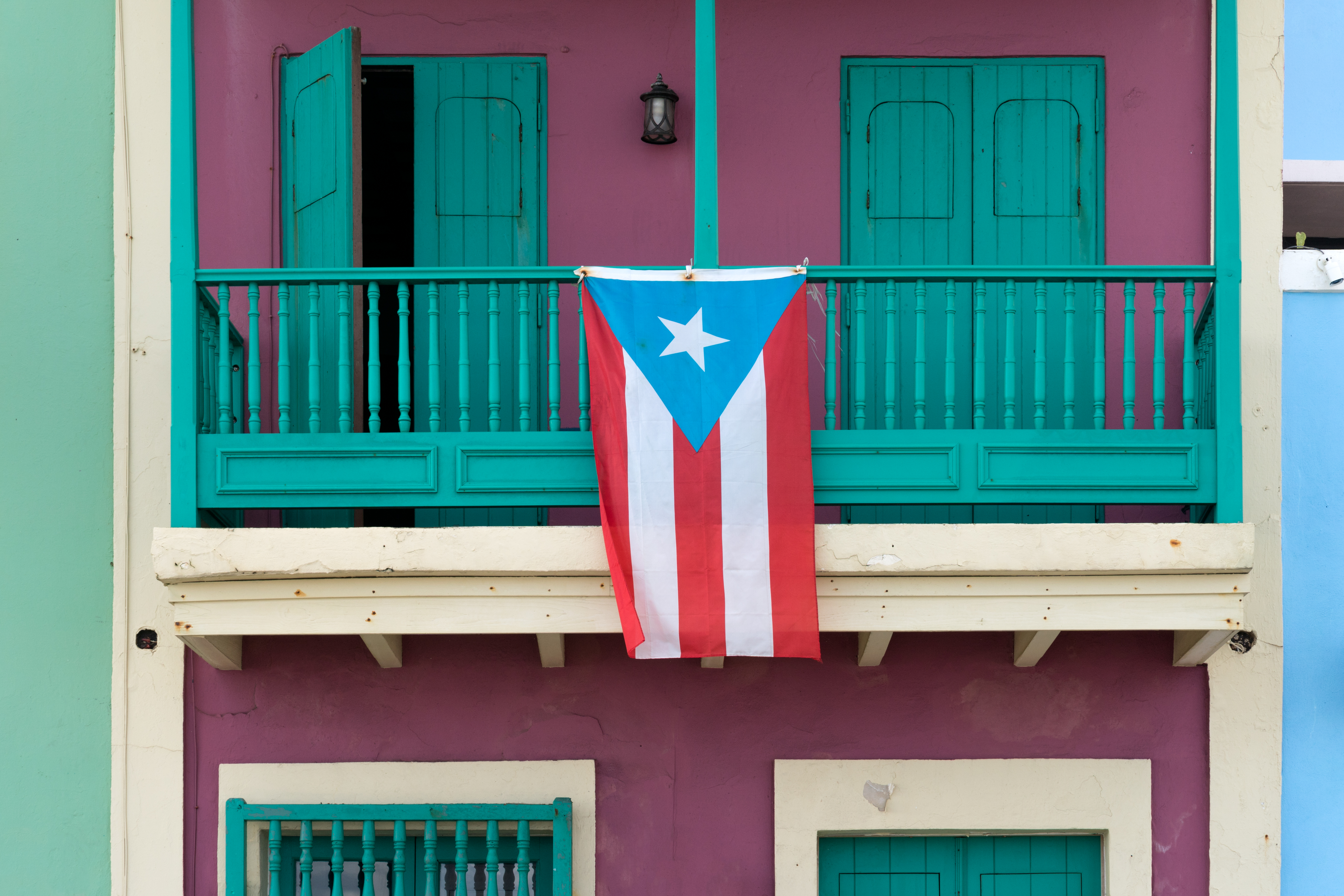
Puerto Rican flag in Old San Juan, Puerto Rico

March 2, 1917 marks the day when Puerto Ricans were granted American citizenship as a result of President Wilson signing the Jones-Shafroth Act. Signing this contract opened a door to a bicameral legislature in the island territory. This was considered advantageous to the U.S. at the time. As the U.S. partook in World War I, over 20,000 Puerto Ricans were drafted, with many of them commanded to guard the Panama Canal. In 1936, a Puerto Rican man named Pedro Albizu Campos and a couple leaders of the Nationalist Party were imprisoned by the U.S. government under the conviction of seditious conspiracy after leading movements in Puerto Rico seeking independence. In 1947 Campos returned to Puerto Rico and restarted his campaign for the same cause being independence. This caused a multitude of concerns for the U.S. government, causing them to label these movements as "anti-American events" and viewed anyone participating in it as threats the government. The Puerto Rican population increased from around 300,000 in 1950 to nearly 5 million by 2012. This migration has majorly impacted a couple of American cities, especially New York City, as it was influencing the culture, politics, and labor markets.

Although Puerto Rico is essentially under United States's authority, being controlled by the United States as an unincorporated territory and governed by the U.S. federal law, it is not a U.S. state. There have been perceptions of exploitation and neglect as a result of this uncertainty. Puerto Rico is the largest overseas dependency, where over three million inhabitants (who are U.S. citizens) and a large diaspora living stateside. The ways in which they were neglected by the U.S are shown in examples such as, U.S. presidential elections where Puerto Ricans on the island cannot vote in these elections leaving them subjected to the federal laws and budgets that govern them. Another example is how the federal government continues to consistently underfund Puerto Rico's Medicaid and Medicare programs unlike all other U.S. states. This forces the territory to manage the severe healthcare disparities with the lack of federal support. In addition, when Hurricane Maria occurred in 2017, it caused millions to live without power and clean water for months. This natural disaster has highlighted the systematic neglect and dysfunction that the U.S government has towards Puerto Rico and its citizens.

== Legal background ==
Before Latinos were allowed to vote, they faced a lot of voting discriminatory practices, especially in the Southwest region of the United States. After the Civil War, many Southern states adopted discriminatory voting practices against African Americans, but also for anyone that was non-white. According to the Mexican American Legal Defense and Educational Fund, Texas laws prohibited Tejanos (Texas residents who descended from Mexico), from speaking Spanish, organizing political demonstrations/protests or even from serving as election judges as early as 1845. By the 1900s poll taxes, and white primaries (only white people were allowed to participate in primaries), prohibited Mexican Americans from voting. It took several laws and court cases to remove voting barriers like this that prohibited Latinos from participating in U.S. politics.

== Voting Rights Act of 1965 ==
The Voting Rights Act of 1965 was signed into law by the 36th U.S. President, Lyndon B.Johnson. The act made it illegal for states, mostly Southern states, to keep discriminatory voting practices in place. This included literacy tests and polling taxes. The law primarily impacted African Americans as they were visibly disenfranchised from voting, but the act also helped remove barriers for Latino voters.

=== Impacts ===
By 1966, after the Voting Rights Act of 1965 was passed, voting discriminatory practices were eliminated under the law. However, the Latino community still faced language barriers to vote. As a result, the Southwest Voter Registration Education Project was started in 1974, becoming the first and largest non-partisan organization in the U.S. Founder William C. Velasquez, created the organization after realizing that language barriers remained for Latinos even after the Voting Rights Act of 1965 was passed. Many Latino voters, including Puerto Ricans, were unable to cast their vote between the time the VRA of 1965 was passed and its revision in 1975.

== Voting Rights Act of 1975 ==
In 1975, 38th U.S. president, Gerald Ford, extended the VRA Act of 1965, to protect language minorities. Specifically, Section 203 of the Voting Rights Act was added to the act, which required certain states (those that have had discriminatory voting practices) to provide language assistance and translated voting materials (e.g., registration forms, ballots, instructions) to language minority groups, during elections. The language minority groups that were included under the provision were those that spoke Asian, American Indian, Alaska Native, or Spanish. These states would also need the federal government's permission to change their voting laws.

States need to provide language assistance if more than 5% of the voting age is not proficient in English or more than 10,000 voting-age citizens are not proficient in English and the citizens that are limited English proficient have less than a 5th-grade education.

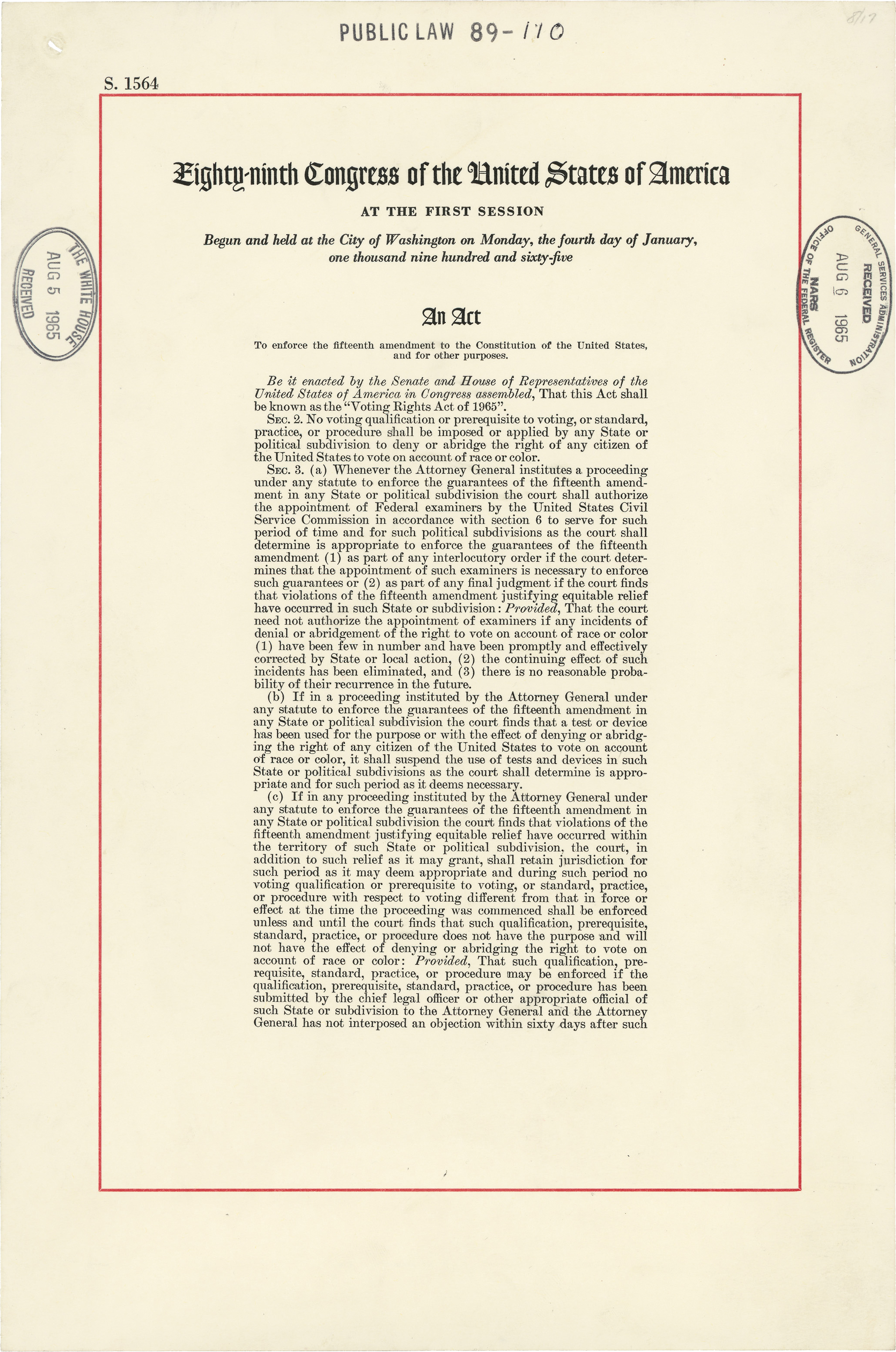
First page of the Voting Rights Act of 1965, signed on August 6, 1965 by President Lyndon Johnson

=== Impacts ===
Since the enactment of the VRA of 1975, the Latino voting block increased by 183%. According to the National Research Council (US) Panel on Hispanics and the United States, Latino officeholders increased in the six states (Arizona, California, Florida, New Mexico, New York, and Texas) with the largest Latino population. In 1973, there were only 1,280 Latino officeholders across these 6 states, by 2003, there were 4,130. John A. Garcia, a political science researcher at the University of Michigan, explains that this increase in political representation is due to the fact that the VRA of 1975 helped create a comfortable environment for Hispanics and Latinos to run for office positions in the Southwestern part of the United States.

In an additional study conducted by Political Scientists, Melissa Marschall and Amanda Rutherford, it was found that Section 203 led to increased Latino representation in political offices, and Latino voter participation. However, the authors found that federal oversight alongside Section 203, ensured that adequately trained bilingual poll workers were present and that voting materials were translated. Without federal monitoring, Section 203 is not as effective.

In "Translating into Votes: The Electoral Impacts of Spanish-Language Ballots" by Daniel J. Hopkins, it was found that the VRA of 1975 significantly increased Latino voter participation in California. The provision eased Spanish speakers anxiousness at the polls and helped them vote down the ballot. However other studies, have argued that language assistance is less of an indicator for voter turnout compared to age and education level.

=== Impacts in Texas ===
Texas was one of the states that had to abide by Section 203 of the VRA of 1975, due to its history of discriminatory voting practices. According to the Department of Justice, since 1982, Texas has had the highest number of voter change objections. There were 54 instances when Texas changed its discriminatory voting law proposals after they knew they would get rejected by the Department of Justice. Section 203 stopped states like Texas from continuing their voter disenfranchisement.

=== Aftermath ===
- 1982: After Section 203 was set to expire, it was renewed again for seven more years.
- 1992: After Section 203 was set to expire again, Rep. Jose E. Serrano (D-NY) introduced the Voting Rights Language Assistance Act, to extend the bill for 15 years, instead of having to renew it every seven years. Supporters for the bill argued that language assistance was necessary for newly naturalized citizens to be civically engaged, while opponents argued that the provision was costly, even suggesting removing it completely. After the political battle, the legislation was signed and passed by President George H. W. Bush on August 26, 1992.
- 2006: When the Voting Rights Language Assistance Act of 1992 was a year away from expiring, a new special provision was added and passed. It was called the "Fannie Lou Hamer, Rosa Parks, Coretta Scott King, Cesar E. Chavez, Barbara Jordan, William Velazquez and Dr. Hector Garcia Voting Rights Act Reauthorization and Amendments Act".

== Notable court cases ==
=== Hernandez v. Texas (1954) ===
In 1954, Pete Hernandez was charged with the murder of Joe Espinosa in Jackson County, Texas. Hernandez argued that the state had incorrectly indicted him, given that most of the jurors were white when Jackson county had a moderate-sized Hispanic population. The court found in Hernandez v. Texas that 11% of Jackson County's population was over the age of 21 and had Spanish surnames, however in the last 25 years, no person with a Latin American name, had served on a jury. Because no Latino was chosen to serve on a jury among the 6,000 slots available in the last 25 years' worth of cases, the court stated it was a form of discrimination, whether it was or was not a conscious decision by Texas. This case has been marked by many legal scholars as the first supreme courts decision to explicitly acknowledge discrimination against Latinos.

==== Impact ====
According to legal scholars, this court case recognized Latinos as a separate race/ethnicity from the binary races (Anglo and African Americans). The case proved that Latinos are not White nor African American, they are a part of their own distinct group. This played an important role in identity politics for the future. Since the court cases decision, court administrators are required to pull jurors from across a community. As a result, diversity in juries has increased, including Latino jurors.

=== Claudio Castaneda, Sheriff v. Rodrigo Partida (1977) ===
In 1977, Rodrigo Partida was convicted of burglary and the intent to rape in Hidalgo County, Texas. After being indicted, Partida argued that he was unfairly convicted because Mexican-Americans were not represented in the jury. At the time, 79.2% of Hidalgos population had Mexican American surnames, but in Partidas' grand jury, only 40% were Mexican American. Texas argued that this was not evidence of discrimination, since Hidalgo county was run by a majority of Mexican Americans, at the time. The court found no evidence of discrimination, but Partida appealed this decision, and the Fifth U.S. Circuit Court reversed the original court's decision. The Fifth U.S. Circuit Court was unable to rule out the possibility that Mexican Americans were being discriminated against even if they were the majority in Hidalgo County.

=== LULAC v. Perry (2006) ===
In 2006, the League of United Latin American Citizens (LULAC) filed a lawsuit against former Texas governor Rick Perry. LULAC argued that the 2003 redistricting plan, which was controlled by Republicans, diluted Latinos' and African Americans' voting power, violating the Voting Rights Act of 1975. The court's decision favored Perry, which helped the Republican party win five congressional seats in Texas and ultimately gain control of Congress that following midterm election.

=== Shelby v. Holder (2013) ===
Under the Voting Rights Act of 1975, 11 states with voter discrimination history (Alabama, California, Florida, Georgia, Louisiana, Mississippi, New York, North Carolina, South Carolina, Texas, and Virginia), were required to seek approval from the Department of Justice (a process called "preclearance") if they wanted to amend a policy. However, in 2013, this "preclearance" requirement was taken away in the Shelby County v. Holder case.

==== Impact ====
In 2021, 19 states, including Florida, Arizona and Texas enacted 34 restrictive voting laws which negatively impacted Latino voters. For example, Texas State Legislature SB 1, makes it difficult for Spanish speakers to cast their vote, since they will noe be able to receive language assistance. Aoters will be required to have a monthly citizenship check, and 24-hour voting drive-throughs are banned. Republicans have argued that this bill is necessary in order to stop voter fraud.

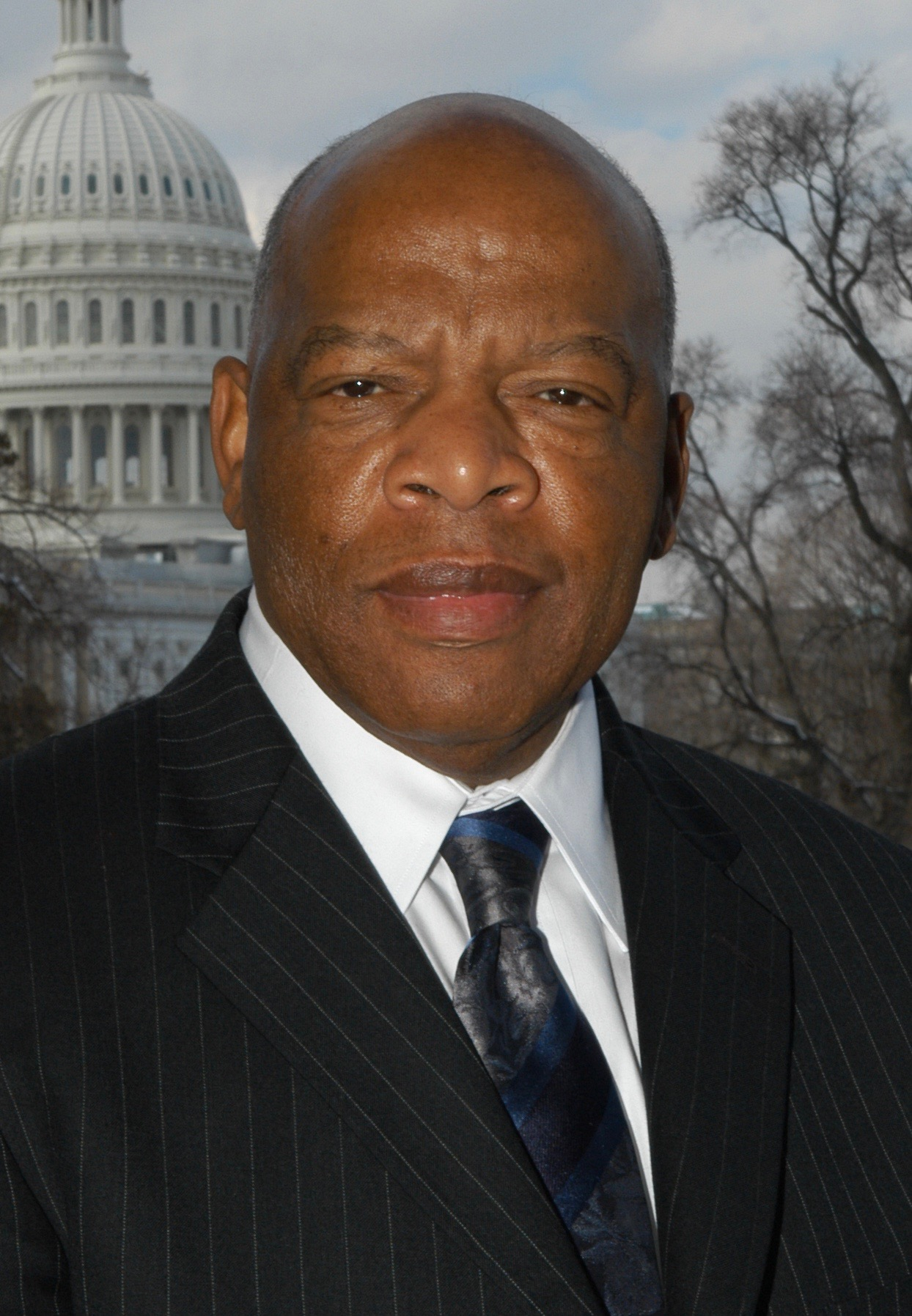
The John Lewis Advancement Act was named after civil rights activist John Lewis.

==== John Lewis Voting Rights Advancement Act of 2021 ====
In reaction to the Shelby v. Holder (2013) decision, the John Lewis Voting Rights Advancement Act of 2021 (VRAA) was proposed to restore the "preclearance" aspect of the Voting Rights Act of 1975. The Department of Justice would decide whether a voting law violates voters' rights. If so, states will be covered by preclearance for the following 10 years.

States would be covered by preclearance if:

- Their local governments have committed at least 10 voting right violations within the past 25 years
- Subdivisions in noncovered states have committed at least three voting rights violations in the past 25 years

On November 3, 2021, the VRAA failed to pass the Senate. It was proposed a second time on January 19, 2022, but it failed again.

== Presidential voting pattern ==
Supermajority support for Democratic presidential candidates is a pattern among Latino voters. In a 2021 Gallup poll, 56% of Latinos identified with the Democratic party, and 26% said they were Republicans. This Democratic support has been consistent throughout presidential elections. Since they began to get polled, Donald Trump came the closest to winning the Latino electorate, losing by only 3%. This was a massive improvement since his first national run, losing the electorate by 36%.

Latino vote in presidential elections (1980-2024)
Year	Democratic candidate	Republican candidate
1980	Jimmy Carter, 56%	Ronald Reagan, 35%
1984	Walter Mondale, 61%	Ronald Reagan, 37%
1988	Michael Dukakis, 69%	George H.W. Bush, 30%
1992 (Note: Independent candidate Ross Perot received 14% of the vote.)	Bill Clinton, 61%	George H.W. Bush, 25%
1996	Bill Clinton, 72%	Bob Dole, 21%
2000	Al Gore, 62%	George W. Bush, 35%
2004	John Kerry, 58%	George W. Bush, 40%
2008	Barack Obama, 67%	John McCain, 31%
2012	Barack Obama, 71%	Mitt Romney, 27%
2016	Hillary Clinton, 65%	Donald Trump, 29%
2020	Joe Biden, 66%	Donald Trump, 32%
2024	Kamala Harris, 51%	Donald Trump, 48%

== Political ideology ==
When Latinos first immigrate to the United States they do not immediately align themselves with a political party or ideology. According to political scientists Lisa Garcia Bedolla and Ramon Michael Alvarez, newly naturalized Latinos are independent, but as they become socialized into American politics, they begin to lean toward a political party. Historically, Mexican Americans and Puerto Ricans attach themselves to the Democratic Party where as Cuban and Venezuelan Americans associate themselves with the Republican party.

=== Democratic support ===
Since 1984, the majority of Latinos have supported and identified with the Democratic Party. From 1984 until 2024, over 57% of Latinos have voted for Democratic presidential candidates. A study conducted by Political Scientists, Leonie Huddy, Lilliana Mason, and S. Nechama Horwitz, explains why Latinos have historically preferred the Democratic Party over the Republican Party. They find that those who identify strongly with their Hispanic identity and believe that their ethnic group is discriminated against, end up strongly supporting the Democratic Party. This was observed heavily in the 2012 election when the Republican Party expressed an anti-Latino and anti-immigration attitude, which in turn motivated Latinos to support the Democrats. The study also showed that Mexicans, Central Americans and Dominicans are more likely than Cubans to support the Democratic Party. An additional explanation for Latinos' support toward the Democratic Party may be that Latinos are Democratic because they are most interested on economic and migration issues, in which the party positively addresses.

=== Republican support ===
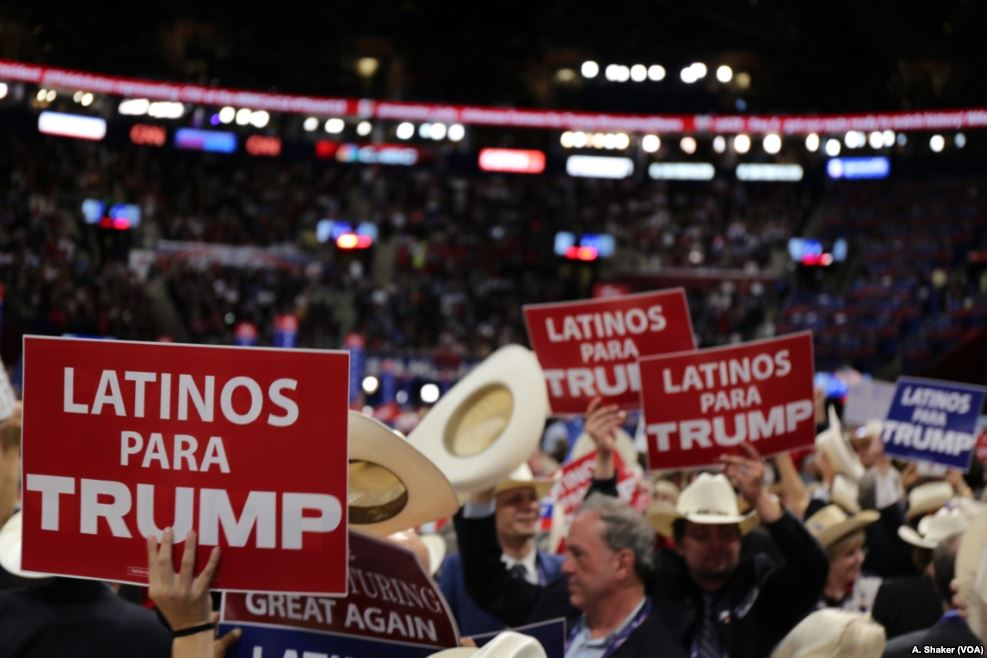
Donald Trump 2016 presidential rally, with "Latinos for Trump" posters

In recent years, multiple news outlets have published stories that Latinos are shifting toward the Republican party given that they have usually outspent Democrats on trying to gain Latino Support. Lionel Sosa, an advertising executive, told Ronald Reagan, "Latinos are Republican, they just don't know it yet", whereas former Senate Democrat Harry Reid, in 2010 said, "I don't know how anyone of Hispanic heritage who could be a Republican. Do I need to say more?"

==== Religion and conservatism ====
According to the Pew Research Center, 76% of Latinos are Christian, while 42% of them are Catholic. A lot of Republicans, claim that Latinos' religiosity should make them support Republicans' conservative policy stances. Academics have tried to understand whether this is true. In a 2000 study, Political Scientist's, Sean M.Bolks, Diana Evans, J.L. Polinard, and Robert D. Wrinkle, discovered that Latinos are opposed to abortions, like Republicans. Political scientist, Marisa A. Abrajano, found that these conservative positions is what drew Latinos to vote for George W. Bush in the 2004 presidential election. This was the largest percentage of votes (40%) that the Republican party had ever received from Latinos during a presidential election until 2024. Other academics have just argued that Latinos liked George W. Bush as a candidate, rather than his party's ideological stances. Some political scientists like Catherine E. Wilson argue the opposite, that churches push Latinos towards the Democratic party.

==== Gender and conservatism ====
Latino men have historically voted more Republican than Latinas since the late 1980s. Christina Bejarano, a Political Scientist at Texas Woman's University, found that Latino men tend to hold on to their conservative values when they migrate, whereas Latinas become ideologically liberal as generations pass. In 1988, researcher, Jones Correa, tried to find explanations for this phenomenon. He found that men experience downward mobility once they migrate to the United States, whereas women have upward mobility. Therefore, men try to hold on to their conservative values, to validate themselves and women try to become more independent. Other studies have tried to explain this political gender gap as a result of moving from a traditional Latin American country to the egalitarian country of the United States.

==== Cubans and conservatism ====
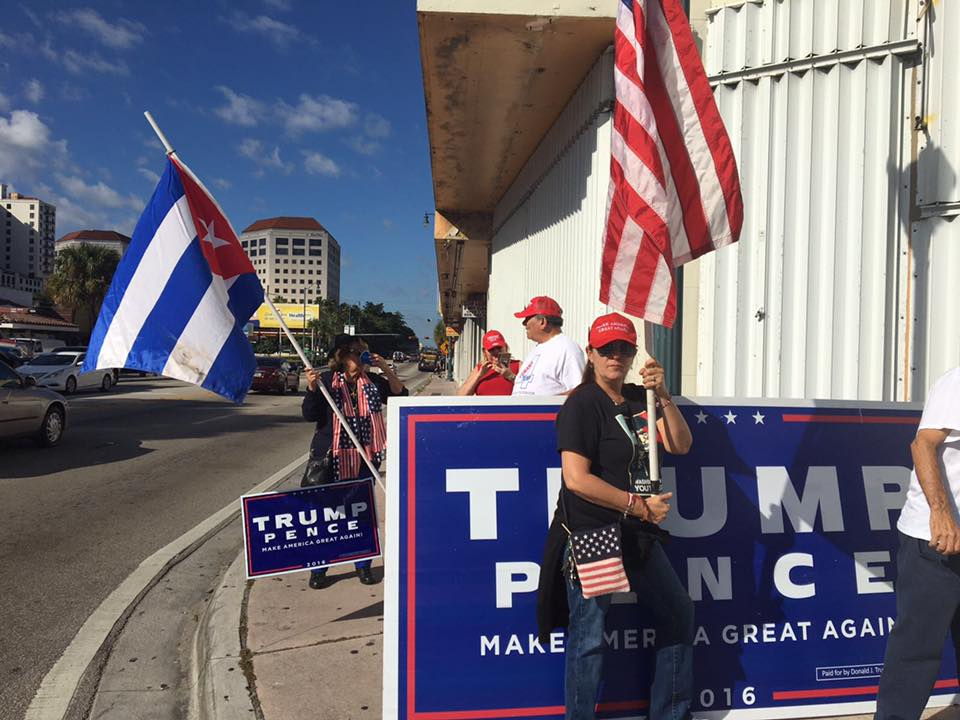
Cubans for Trump rally

Historically, Cubans are one of the few Latino national origin groups that have consistently been strong supporters of the Republican party. In the 2016 presidential election, over half of the Cuban population voted for Donald Trump. Sociologist Alejandro Portes and politician Rafael Mozo have tried to explain why Cubans do not vote for the Democratic Party. They find that Cubans support the Republican Party out of fear that Democrats will turn the United States into a communist country. Other studies have argued that Cubans do not vote for Democrats because they do not experience immigration related issues, since they are able to apply for permanent residency a year after arriving to the United States through the Cuban Adjustment Act of 1966.

==== Alternative perspectives ====
Other studies have tried to fully disprove that Latinos are becoming Republican. Eric Gonzalez Juenke, a Political Science researcher at Michigan State University, found that most conservative Latinos are not citizens, therefore they cannot vote and express their support to the Republican party through elections. Therefore, citizenship needs to be considered when interviewing Latinos about their political opinions, as this can be misleading information in upcoming elections.

=== Abortion ===
The Pew Research Center survey indicates that over half (57%) of Hispanic voters view abortion as a serious issue and support abortion in at least some cases. Another survey shows 69% of Latinos viewing abortion bans can put women's lives at risk. An Associated Press survey also found around 6 in 10 Hispanic Protestants and about two-thirds of Hispanic Catholics believe abortion should be legal in most or all cases.

=== LGBTQ rights ===
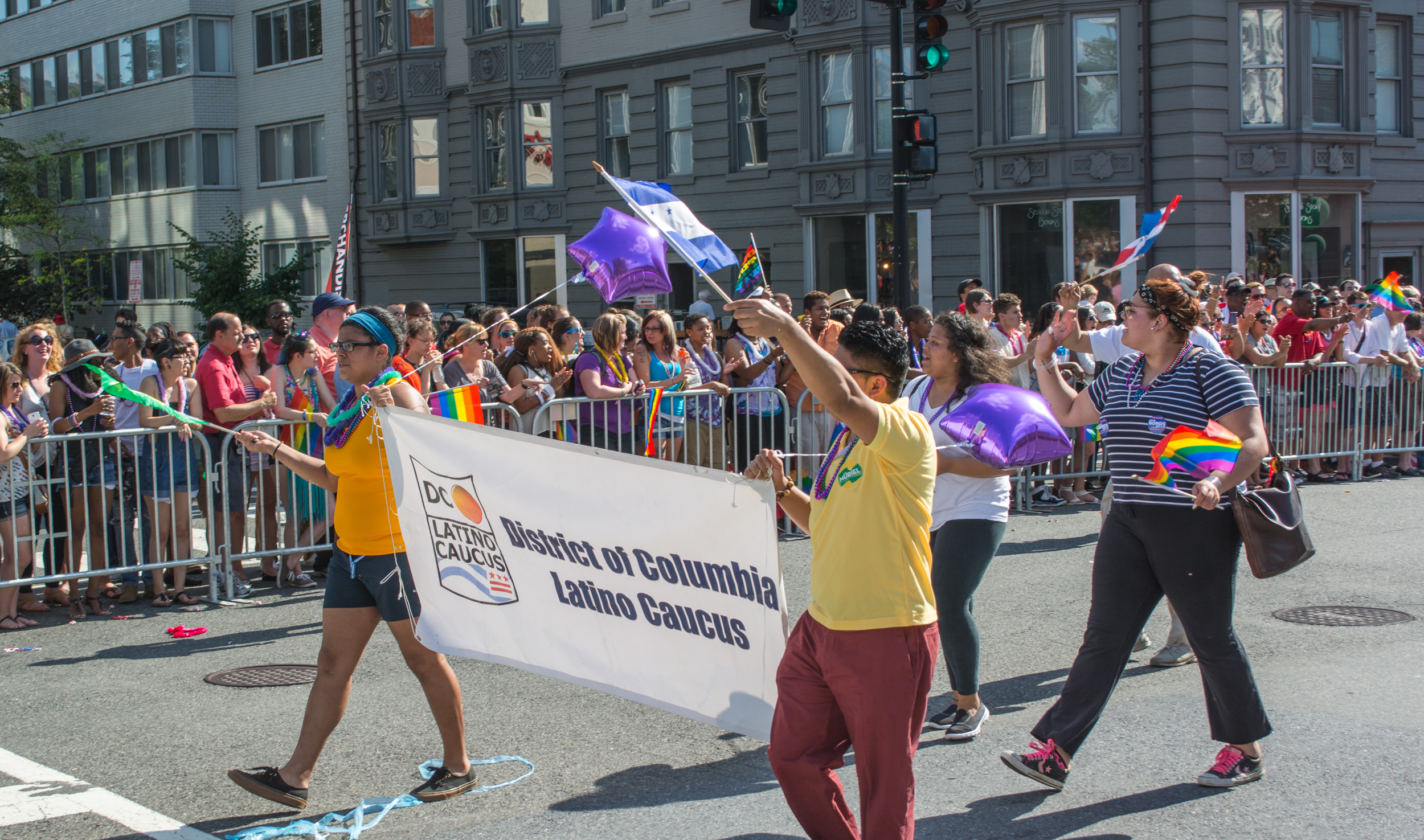
Washington DC Latino Pride

== Political interest and participation among Latinos ==
A study by Professor Maria E. Len-Ríos of the University of Georgia suggests that Latinos' level of political interest is positively associated with their level of engagement. Len-Ríos collected data from a national survey of 434 Latinos, 26.8% of whom said that they were interested in politics. One in five people reported interacting with a campaign on social media; 6% had donated to a campaign before; and one in ten had sent an email to their elected representatives. The percentage of Latinos whom find it important to donate money to campaign issues, work together on community problems, and to attend protests on salient issues, is higher than those for their white counterparts. Social media has also been used prevalently as a political tool for Latinos, especially Latino youth. Over 1/3 of the respondents to the CMPS survey use social media to discuss politics. Between the political interest and political participation variables there was a statistically significant correlation. In other words, individuals who were interested in politics were more involved in politics than people who were less interested.

=== 2016 and 2020 presidential election ===
In the 2020 presidential election, Latino turnout surpassed past voting records. The Pew Research Center found that 54% of registered Latino voters were motivated to vote in the election that year. By comparison, 69% of all U.S. registered voters said they were motivated to vote. Half of eligible Latinos (53.7%) ended up voting that year. This increased mobilization in 2016 and 2020 has been explained by various studies as a result of Donald Trumps' xenophobic attitude and targets toward the Latino population. His anti-immigration rhetoric emotionally angered Latinos, which created a pan-ethnic solidarity movement amongst them, driving them to the polls to vote against Trump during both elections. However, expectations about ethnic solidarity notwithstanding, Latino support for Donald Trump in fact grew between the 2016 and 2020 presidential elections. Latinos showed considerably more variance in voting behavior than what would be expected given accounts focused mainly on their ethnic solidarity. A 2024 study proposes a counterintuitive explanation for this trend: due to the activation of dormant political dispositions, it is the very anti-immigration attitudes characterizing Trump that account for his ascendence among Latino voters. In other words, Latinos voting for Trump did so because of his anti-immigration positions and not despite those positions.

=== Church role in political engagement ===
Researchers have tried to determine whether church attendance increases Latinos participation in American Politics. In study conducted by researchers, Sarah Allen Gershon, Adrian D. Pantoja and J.Benjamin Taylor, they found that church attendance does correlate to civic engagement, however other factors such as generational status, economic status and employment can influence this. Given that younger generations of Latinos attend church at a lesser rate than older generations, demographic factors will determine whether they are politically engaged or not.

== Law enforcement of Latinx communities ==
Latino communities in the United States have a long history of difficult relationships with the police. This goes back to the war between the United States and Mexico, when Mexican residents became part of the United States without having to move. Law enforcement in the western and southwestern United States was focused on protecting Anglo-American interests. Latino communities reported discrimination, unfair treatment, and racial profiling by the police. Latino communities were often perceived as "others" in society, which influenced the way they were treated. Trust issues between the police and Latino communities are still ongoing today.

== Police brutality and ongoing issues ==
Police brutality has been part of the experience of policing in Latino communities. The issues that Latino communities face with law enforcement are racial and ethnic bias. The relationship between police and Latino communities is troubled by a long history of racism, unfair policing tactics, corruption, and police brutality.

Violence involving law enforcement and Mexican and Latino communities in the United States has been documented over a long period of time. From 1915 to 1920, it was recorded that around 5,000 Mexicans were killed by the Texas Rangers. The Texas Rangers became part of the Texas Department of Public Safety. Some former Texas Rangers joined the Border Patrol when it was formed in the 1920s. Some of the history of state-sanctioned police violence against Latino communities has been erased, and some are unknown or not talked about.

=== Modern cases of police killings ===
On June 18, 2020, Salvadoran American Andres Guardado (18 years old) was shot and killed by a Los Angeles sheriff's deputy. At the time of his death, he was working as a security guard at an auto-body shop. Law enforcement assumed that Guardado had a gun. The autopsy revealed that he was shot five times in the back, and his death was classified as homicide. The deputy was not interviewed by investigators and was not charged with murder.

On June 2, 2020, Sean Monterrosa (22 years old) was shot and killed by a detective in Vallejo, California. The police stated that Monterrosa was in a position to shoot someone, and the officer assumed he had a gun. It was proven that there was no possession of a gun, and it was reported that the object that he had was a hammer.

On Jun 6, 2020, California Patrol officers in Oakland shot and killed Erik Salgado (23 years old) and his pregnant girlfriend. Salgado died; his girlfriend survived, but she lost the baby. The police stated that Salgado was driving into police cars. He was in half-kneeling position when he was shot.

In 2013, Andy Lopez (13 years old) was shot seven times and died in Sonoma County because a deputy assumed that a toy gun was a real AK-47.

In 2014, Alex Nieto (28 years old) was shot and killed at San Francisco Park while eating, and officers who saw him thought a Taser he was carrying was a gun. He was shot 23 times by one officer and 20 times by another officer. There were no criminal charges filed in these cases.

=== Data and documentation of police killings ===
Between 2000 and 2020, 465 Latino individuals were killed by police in Los Angeles County. Between 2015 and 2020, it is reported that 910 Hispanic individuals were killed by the police nationally. Latino individuals may be undercounted in criminal justice data because some states record race but not ethnicity.

=== Police killings of Latinos in 2025 ===
Law enforcement officers across the United States have killed 344 people in total in 2025. There are 42 people killed between January and March who were Latinos or people of Hispanic descent (averaging about one death every two days).

Records from Campaign Zero, an organization advocating against police violence, show that there were 177 deaths of Latinos at the hands of police in 2013. By 2023, that number has risen to 246. It was increased by nearly 40% in just 10 years.

Most of the deaths took place during responses to domestic disturbances, mental health crises, traffic stops, and other nonviolent incidents.

In California, on March 15, Pedro Garcia (15 years old) was shot and killed in his home in Fullerton. Officers responded to a 911 call reporting a stabbing inside a home. When officers arrived, they encountered a person outside the house. The individual did not listen to the commands and later pulled out a pellet gun. The police fired and killed him, but they ended up killing Garcia during the incident. A witness, Gabriela Ordonez, yelled at officers during the shooting and asked them to stop. She said that the shooting continued even while her son was on the ground. Another witness said that the police officers kept shooting despite the situation at the scene.

== Media and Latino politics ==
Most Latinos obtain their news from Spanish language television networks. Given this, many academics have attempted to analyze the relationship between media and Latino politics.

=== Media ===
In a study conducted by political scientists Sergio I. Garcia-Rios and Matt A. Barreto, it was found that Univision and other Spanish-language news outlets, created a pan-ethnic identity among Latinos, which motivated them to vote in a historically large number in the 2012 presidential election. Since immigration was a main debate topic during election season, Latinos were reminded of their immigrant identity even as U.S. citizens. Spanish news media influencers, such as Jorge Ramos, Maria Elena Salinas, and Pilar Marero, made frequent announcements to the Latino community, reporting the immigration issues that were at stake if they did not vote. In culmination, these factors motivated Latinos to vote.

In another study, Swiss academic, Felix Oberholzer-Gee and American economist, Joel Waldfogel, tried to find whether general Spanish language television networks increase Latino voter turnout. Their results were significant, indicating that the presence of Spanish language television networks like Univision, can increase civic engagement among Latinos.

=== Univision voter registration campaigns ===
Logo of Univision, Spanish television network

Univision is the nation's largest Spanish language television network. According to Della de Lafuente, Emmy award-winning journalist and former president of the National Association of Hispanic Journalists (NAHJ), Univision provides the Latino community resources such as for finding a doctor, a school for their children, or a job. Since 2007, they have also initiated efforts to politically mobilize the Latino community. In 2007, the network made history by hosting and broadcasting the first presidential debates in Spanish. In the 2008 primary elections, Univision released a "Ve y Vota en las Primarias" ("Get Out and Vote in the Primaries) 30-second ad to its viewers. Cesar Conde former chief strategist for Univision, stated that the network is making it a priority to help inform and motivate Latinos about the political process. The television network has continued on these efforts from national to local elections.

==== 2016 presidential election ====
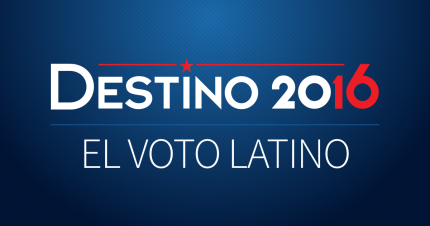
Univision's voter registration campaign "Destiny 2016, the Latino vote" during the 2016 presidential election

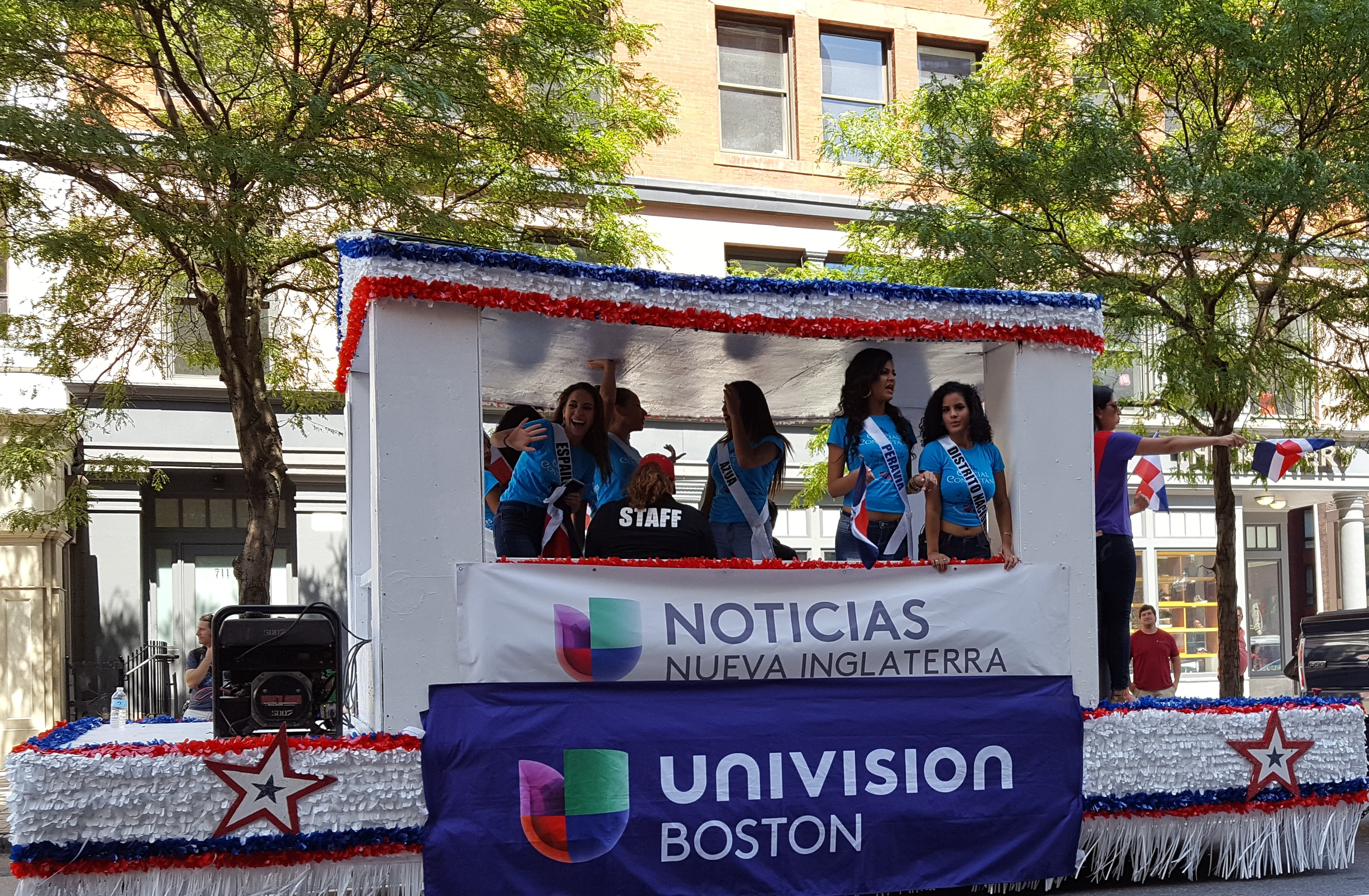
The Univision parade float in Boston's 2016 Dominican Parade

During the 2016 presidential election, Univision carried out a voter registration campaign (#VotaConmigo) to increase Latino voter participation. In February 2016, Univision announced its attempts to register over 3 million new Latino voters, based on the number of Latinos that became eligible to vote since the last presidential election in 2012. Jessica Herrera-Flanigan, Univision's executive vice president, stated to the Washington Post, "As a media company, we have the ability to educate and tell people whats happening on air and off air...We have the voice." Following their campaign announcement, the television network broadcast commercials, encouraging people to call the citizenship hotline, National Association of Latino Elected and Appointed Officials (NALEO). In the next month, William Valdes, co-host of Despierta America, a morning segment, hosted a Facebook Live, talking about his U.S. citizenship process. That day, NALEO received 20,000 calls, surpassing the other days' average of 100 calls. Univision ended up registering over 200,000 new Latinos to vote in 2016.

==== Criticism ====
A Washington Post op-ed by Callum Brochers argued that Univision's campaigns are designed to help the Democratic party, not to help Latinos become politically involved. As evidence, Callum, revealed that Haim Saban, Univision's chairman, has consistently donated money to the Democratic party. In the 2016 election, Haim Saban donated $2.5 million to Priorities USA Action, a super Political Action Committee (PAC), that supported Hilary Clintons campaign. Ken Oliver-Mendez, director of an organization that tracks liberal bias, also shared that Univision broadcasts liberal-leaning news, as Republicans are not covered fairly within the platform. In the 2020 presidential election, Donald Trump's campaign called Univision "leftist propaganda". However, Univision has continuously stated that it is a non-partisan network.

== Current Latino politicians ==
=== Senators ===
There are six Latino Senators in the United States Senate, four Latino Democrats and two Latino Republicans.

- Catherine Cortez Masto (D-NV): first Latina elected to serve as a U.S. senator from Nevada
- Ted Cruz (R-TX): first Latino American to serve as a U.S. senator from Texas, former 2016 presidential candidate
- Ruben Gallego (D-AZ): first Latino elected to serve as a U.S. senator from Arizona
- Ben Ray Luján (D-NM): first Latino chairman of the Democratic Congressional Campaign Committee (DCCC)
- Bernie Moreno (R-OH): first Latino elected to serve as a U.S. senator from Ohio
- Alex Padilla (D-CA): first Mexican American and Latino senator from California

=== Representatives ===
There are 41 Latino Representatives in the United States House of Representatives, 31 Latino Democrats and ten Latino Republicans.

- Antonio Delgado (D-NY 19th District): first person of Latin American descent to be elected to Congress from Upstate New York
- Adriano Espaillat, (D-NY 13th District): first formerly undocumented immigrant to serve in Congress
- Raúl Grijalva (D-AZ 7th District): dean of Arizona's Congressional Delegation
- Brian Mast (R-FL 21st District): staff sergeant in the U.S. Army; lost both of his legs while serving as an explosive ordnance disposal technician in the U.S. Army in 2010; awarded the Bronze Star, Purple Heart, Defense Meritorious Service Medal and Army Commendation Medal for actions in service
- Alex Mooney (R-VA 2nd District): first Latino man elected to Congress from West Virginia
- Alexandria Ocasio-Cortez (D-NY 13th District): took office in 2019 at age 29 as the youngest woman ever to serve in the United States Congress, among the first female members of the Democratic Socialists of America elected to serve in Congress
- Raul Ruiz (D-CA 25th District): first Latino to receive three graduate degrees from Harvard University, attending Harvard Medical School, the John F. Kennedy School of Government and Harvard School of Public Health
- Maria Elvira Salazar (R-FL 27th District): former journalist, recipient of five Emmy Awards for several reports on Nicaragua, Cuba and Dominican Republic
- Linda Sanchez (D-CA 38th District): first woman of color ever to be elected to a leadership position in the history of the U.S. Congress
- Ritchie Torres (D-NY 15th District): first openly gay Afro Latino elected to Congress, one of the first two openly gay Black men elected to Congress
- Nydia Velázquez (D-NY 7th District): first Puerto Rican woman to serve in the United States Congress

== 2022 midterm election ==
The 2023 class of incoming Congress members is historic for the Latino community. This is the largest cohort of Latinos to be sworn into Congress. According to Vox News, 14 Latino candidates were elected to join the 34 incumbents, indicating that the 118th Congress class will be 11% Latino (34 Democrats, 11 Republicans). Representative Ruben Gallego (D-AZ) commented, "Invest in Latino voters. Talk to Latino voters early and recruit Latinos and Latinas to run and not just in majority Latino districts", after the midterm outcomes.

Picture	Congressman	Party	State	District	Term	Notes
Maxwell Frost	Maxwell Frost	Democratic	Florida	10th	2023–present	Maxwell was elected at 25 years old, making him the first member of Gen-Z to be elected into Congress as well as the first Afro-Cuban to be sworn in.
Robert Garcia	Robert Garcia	Democratic	California	42nd	2023–present	Garcia is the first openly LGBTQ+ immigrant (from Peru) to be elected into Congress.
Marie Gluesenkamp Perez	Marie Perez	Democratic	Washington	3rd	2023–present	Perez is the first Latina Democrat to be sworn into Congress from Washington state.
Delia Catalina Ramirez	Delia Ramirez	Democratic	Illinois	3rd	2023–present	Ramirez is the first Latina to represent Illinois in Congress.
Andrea Salinas	Andrea Salinas	Democratic	Oregon	6th	2023–present	Salinas, alongside Deremer, is one of the first Latinas to represent Oregon in Congress.
Yadira Caraveo	Yadira Caraveo	Democratic	Colorado	8th	2023–present	Caraveo is Colorado's first Latina representative.
Greg Casar	Greg Casar	Democratic	Texas	35th	2023–present	At age 25, Casar became the youngest council member in Austin's history, before being elected into Congress.
Rob Menendez Jr.	Rob Menendez Jr.	Democratic	New Jersey	8th	2023–present	Menendez is the son of New Jersey Senator Bob Menendez.
Gabriel Vasquez	Gabriel Vasquez	Democratic	New Mexico	2nd	2023–present	Vasquez was the first in his family to be born in the United States, which motivated him to pursue politics and advocate for Latinos.
Lori Chavez DeRemer	Lori Chavez DeRemer	Republican	Oregon	5th	2023–present	DeRemer was the first Republican woman to represent Oregon in the House of Representatives.
Juan Ciscomani	Juan Ciscomani	Republican	Arizona	6th	2023–present	Ciscomani was the first in his family to graduate from college, attending Pima Community College and the University of Arizona.
Monica De La Cruz	Monica De La Cruz	Republican	Texas	15th	2023–present	De La Cruz is the first Republican to represent Texas' 15th Congressional district since 1903.
Anthony D'Esposito	Anthony D'Esposito	Republican	New York	4th	2023–present	D'Esposito is the first Republican to publicly support George Santos' resignation after he gave out false biographical information.
Anna Paulina Luna	Anna Paulina Luna	Republican	Florida	13th	2023–present	Luna is the first Mexican-American woman to be elected to Congress in Florida.
George Anthony Devolder Santos	George Santos	Republican	New York	3rd	2023	The first Brazilian-American elected to Congress, Santos was a part of the first congressional race in which two LGBTQ+ candidates competed against each other. He was expelled from Congress on December 1, 2023.

== Latino political organizations ==
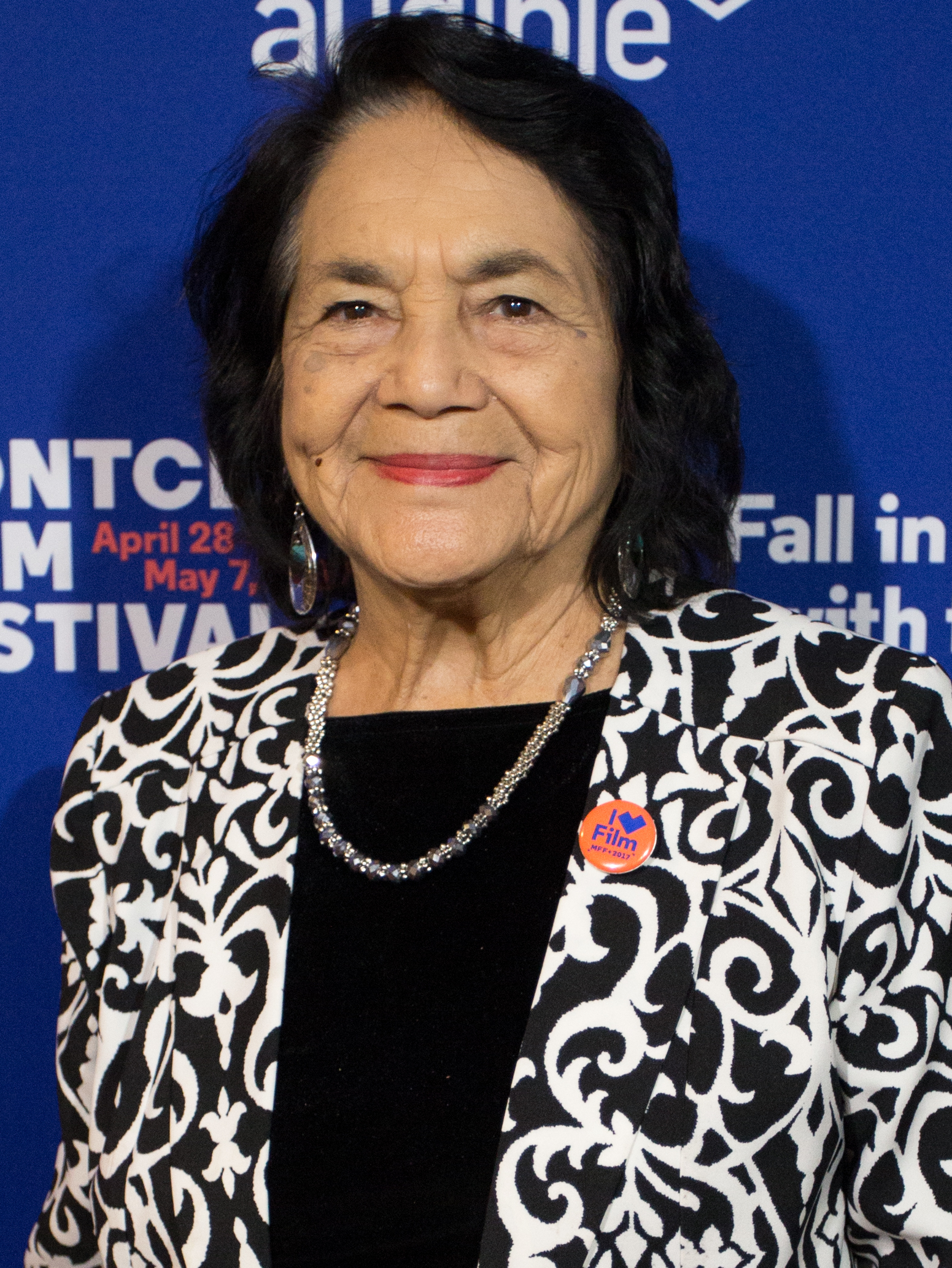
Dolores Huerta at the Montclair Film Festival 2017

In the early 20th century Latin Americans formed organizations for mutual support. After World War II, Mexican American women started groups such as LULAC and the Community Service Organization (CSO). Through the CSO, union activists Cesar Chavez and Dolores Huerta met and started the United Farm Workers (UFW) in the early 1960s. The United Farm Workers (UFW) was a labor union organization established to improve better working conditions for the treatment of farmworkers in the United States. Founded in 1962, the organization sought to address issues such as low wages, unsafe working environments, and lack of legal protections for farmworkers. Through these efforts, the union successfully negotiated labor contracts that provided workers with higher wages, health benefits, and improved working conditions. The UFW also played a significant role in advancing the broader labor and civil rights movements in America.

In 1960 Dolores Huerta started the Agricultural Workers Association (AWA). Huerta led the UFW grape boycott in Delano, California in 1965. This strike lasted five years and received national attention. Huerta continued to work with political organizations afterward, and in 2003 founded the Dolores Huerta Foundation (DHF). The purpose of the Foundation is to build networks of social justice organizations.

- Chicanos Por La Causa
- Congressional Hispanic Caucus
- Congressional Hispanic Conference
- Hispanic Democratic Organization
- Hispanic Leadership PAC
- National Association of Latino Elected and Appointed Officials
- National Institute for Latino Policy
- Tomas Rivera Policy Institute
- UnidosUS
- United We Dream
- Voto Latino
- Mi Familia Vota
- League of United Latin American Citizens (LULAC)
- Latino Victory Fund

== Notable protests ==
- A Day Without Immigrants
- 2006 United States immigration reform protests
- March 2006 LAUSD student walkouts

== See also ==
- List of Latino Republicans
- List of Latino Democrats
- Ethnocultural politics in the United States
