= Teppo Felin =

Finnish business theorist (1973-)

Teppo Felin (born 1970s) is the Ion Foundation Endowed Professor at the David Eccles School of Business, University of Utah. Prior to this, he was the Douglas D. Anderson Professor of Strategy & Entrepreneurship at the Huntsman School of Business at Utah State University. From 2013 to 2021, Felin was Professor of Strategy at the Saïd Business School at the University of Oxford. His current research focuses on cognition, artificial intelligence, rationality, perception, organizational economics, markets and strategy.

== Life and work ==
Born in Helsinki, Finland, Felin obtained a Ph.D. from the David Eccles School of Business at the University of Utah.

After his graduation in 2005, he was appointed as an associate professor at the Marriott School of Management at Brigham Young University. In 2013, he was appointed Professor of Strategy at the Saïd Business School at the University of Oxford in the United Kingdom. He was a visiting professor at the Goizueta Business School at Emory University in 2004-05, and at the Helsinki University of Technology in 2007. He is co-editor of the journal Strategic Organization and associate editor of Academy of Management Annals. His research has been published in Academy of Management Review, Journal of Management, Organization Science, PLOS ONE, MIT Sloan Management Review, Journal of Management Studies, Erkenntnis, and other research outlets. In 2012, he edited a special issue on markets, aggregation and the wisdom of crowds (in the journal Managerial and Decision Economics) which included contributions from political scientist Scott E. Page, economist Bruno Frey, economist Nicolai J. Foss, economist Peter Leeson, social psychologist Steve Kozlowski, organizational scholar Margit Osterloh, physicist Claudio Castellano, biologist David Sumpter, sociologist Robb Willer, and many others.

In the early 2000s, Felin, Nicolai J. Foss, and Peter Abell were engaged in research on the foundations of organizations and strategy, which resulted in the 2005 article "Strategic organization: A field in search of micro-foundations." He is doing research with biologist Stuart Kauffman on the emergence of novelty in economic settings. This work has recently been applied to the context of the United States Constitution and the problem of designing laws. This article received responses from Constitutional scholars Steven G. Calabresi and Sanford Levinson and Nobel Laureate Vernon L. Smith. In 2015, Teppo Felin interviewed entrepreneur and venture capitalist Peter Thiel at the University of Oxford.

Felin is also doing research with mathematician Jan Koenderink and psychologist Joachim Krueger (Brown University) on the nature of cognition, rationality and perception. A general audience version of this research was published in Aeon Magazine, under the title "The Fallacy of Obviousness". Related to this essay, Felin was interviewed in 2018 by economist Russ Roberts for the podcast EconTalk. In 2024 he also appeared on Econtalk to discuss artificial intelligence and the limits of prediction. He has also collaborated with theoretical physicist George Ellis and biologist Denis Noble on a set of articles published in the journal Genome Biology.

== Selected publications ==
Articles, a selection:

- Felin, Teppo, and Nicolai J. Foss. "Strategic organization: A field in search of micro-foundations." Strategic organization 3.4 (2005): 441.
- Felin, Teppo, and William S. Hesterly. "The knowledge-based view, nested heterogeneity, and new value creation: Philosophical considerations on the locus of knowledge." Academy of Management Review 32.1 (2007): 195-218.
- King, Brayden G., Teppo Felin, and David A. Whetten. "Finding the organization in organizational theory: A meta-theory of the organization as a social actor." Organization Science 21.1 (2010): 290-305.
- Felin, Teppo, and Todd R Zenger. "Closed or open innovation? Problem solving and the governance choice." Research Policy 43.5 (2014): 914-925.
- Felin, Teppo and Stuart Kauffman. "Disruptive evolution: Harnessing functional excess, experimentation, and science as tool. Industrial and Corporate Change 32.6 (2023): 1372-1392.
- Felin, Teppo, Alfonso Gambardella, Elena Novelli, and Todd Zenger. "A scientific method for startups." Journal of Management 50.8 (2024): 3080-3014.
- Felin, Teppo, and Matthias Holweg. "Theory is all you need: AI, human cognition, and causal reasoning." Strategy Science 9.4 (2024): 297-514.
- Sako, Mari, and Teppo Felin. "Does AI prediction scale to decision making." Communications of the ACM 68.4 (2025): 18-21.
