= Paul Émile de Puydt =

Botanist and writer (1810–1891)

- Born: 6 March 1810; Mons, Belgium
- Died: 20 May 1891 (aged 81); Mons, Belgium
- Known for: Les Orchidées, histoire iconographique, organographie, classification, géographie, collections, commerce, emploi, culture, avec une revue descriptive des espèces cultivées en Europe
- Spouse: Fanie Catherine Cousin
- Children: Two
- Parents: Jean Ambroise de Puydt (father); Marie Adélaïde Jeanne Michot (mother)
- Scientific career
- Fields: Writer on botany and economics
- Author abbrev. (botany): De Puydt

Paul Émile de Puydt (6 March 1810 – 20 May 1891) was a Belgian writer whose contributions included work in botany and economics.

As a botanist, Paul Émile de Puydt notably wrote on orchids. The standard botanical author abbreviation De Puydt is applied to species he described.

As a political economist, he is known as inventor of the concept of people having the freedom to choose which government to join, and governments having to compete for citizens. He has given the name panarchy to this concept. His paper "Panarchie" was first published in French in the Revue Trimestrielle, in Brussels, July 1860. Panarchie and its author Paul Emile de Puydt was only recently rediscovered. The notion of competitive government, but then limited to defence, can also be found in the writings of the Belgian economist Gustave de Molinari from 1849, eleven years before de Puydt. David Hart of the Department of History of Stanford University suggests that Paul-Émile de Puydt might have been influenced by the works of his fellow countryman Gustave de Molinari.

== Biography ==
Paul-Émile was born and died in Mons, Belgium. His father was Jean Ambroise de Puydt (1758–1836), who was governor of the province Hainaut in the early days of Belgium from 1830 till 1834. In the first marriage of his father there were 6 children. The famous Remi de Puydt came from this first marriage. He is a half brother of Paul Émile de Puydt. Remi de Puydt was a civil engineer and a politician (representative), and he served in the Belgian army as a colonel.

Paul-Émile was the second child of four children from the second marriage of his father, who married in 1799 Marie Adélaïde Jeanne Michot (c. 1777 – 1858).

After his studies, he turned to journalism and worked as an editor of "L'Observateur du Hainaut". Together with Henri-Florent Delmotte and Hippolyte Rousselle, he wrote in 1831, the year when the current Belgium became separated from the northern Netherlands, the theatre piece "Le candidat à la royauté: esquisse en trois tableaux mêlés de couplets". This play was performed in Mons in 1831. He then participated in the government, and he was also director of the Mont-de-piété of Mons.

In his free time he was interested in botany, and he developed a pronounced interest in orchids. Since 1831 he was secretary of the founded societé d'horticulture de Mons. In 1833 he worked on the foundation of the Societé des arts et des lettres du Hainaut, where he was vice-president and, from 1865 onwards, president.

Paul-Émile de Puydt married in 1841 Fanie Catherine Cousin (1819–1905). They had two children: Julien-Vincent-Émile de Puydt (1842–1921) and Philippine-Therese-Marie de Puydt (1843–1892).

== Panarchy ==
In an 1860 article, de Puydt first proposed the idea of panarchy: a political philosophy that emphasizes each individual's right to freely choose (join and leave) the jurisdiction of any governments they choose, without being forced to move from their current locale. A proponent of laissez-faire economics, he wrote that "governmental competition" would let "as many regularly competing governments as have ever been conceived and will ever be invented" exist simultaneously and detailed how such a system would be implemented. As David M. Hart writes: "Governments would become political churches, only having jurisdiction over their congregations who had elected to become members." Three similar ideas are "Functional Overlapping Competing Jurisdictions" (FOCJ) advocated by Swiss economists Bruno Frey and Reiner Eichenberger, "multigovernment" advocated by Le Grand E. Day and others, and "meta-utopia" from Robert Nozick's Anarchy, State, and Utopia.

== Works ==
=== Botany ===
- Traité théorique et pratique de la culture des plantes de serre froide, orangerie et serre tempérées des jardiniers, précédé de notions pratiques de physiologie végétale et de physique horticole, et de conseils pour la construction des différentes serres. 1860
- Les Poires de Mons. 1860

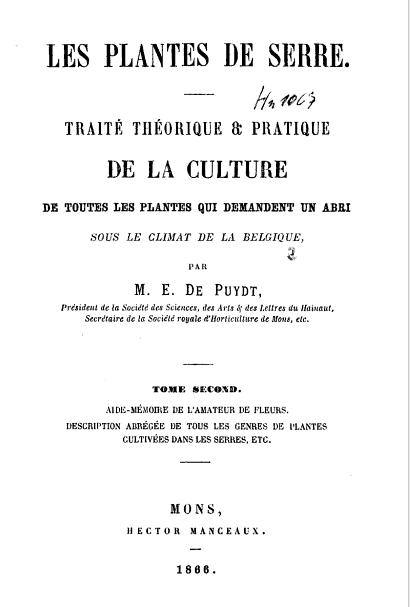
Front cover of the Book "Les Plantes de Serre. Traité théorique et Pratique de la culture de toutes les plantes qui demandent un abri."

- Les Plantes de serre, traité théorique et pratique de la culture de toutes les plantes qui demandent un abri sous le climat de la Belgique. 2 vols, 1866
- Les Orchidées, histoire iconographique, organographie, classification, géographie, collections, commerce, emploi, culture, avec une revue descriptive des espèces cultivées en Europe. Ouvrage orné de 244 vignettes et de 50 chromo-lithographies, dessinées d'après nature sous la direction de M. Leroy, dans les serres de M. Guibert,1880

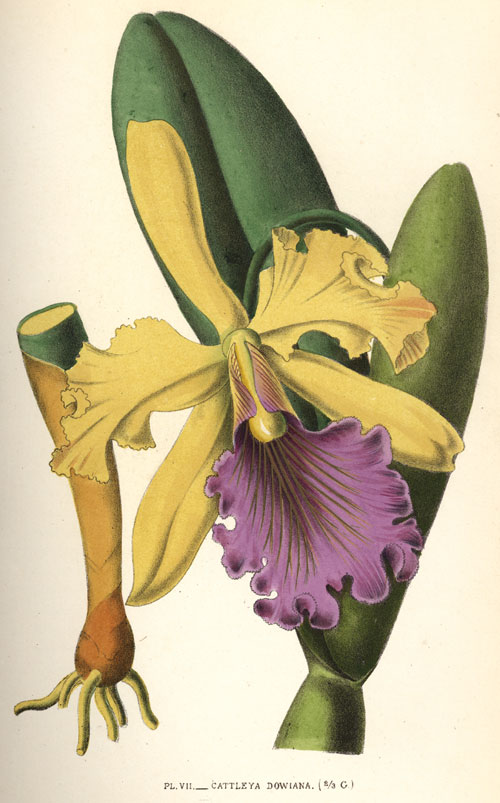
Drawing from the illustrated book "Les Orchidées, histoire iconographique, organographie, classification, géographie, collections, commerce, emploi, culture, avec une revue descriptive des espèces cultivées en Europe."

=== Social sciences ===
- Panarchy, first published in French in the Revue Trimestrielle, Bruxelles, July 1860, page 222 to 245
- https://books.google.com/books?id=8SIWAAAAYAAJ
- La Charité et les institutions de bienfaisance. 1867
- Marche et progrès de la civilisation dans les temps modernes. 1870
- La Grève. 1876
- La Littérature et les Arts, dans leurs rapports avec la morale. SOCIÉTÉ DES SCIENCES, DES ARTS ET DES LETTRES DU HAINAUT. TROISIÈME SÉRIE. TOME SEPTIÈME. ANNÉE 1871–1872.

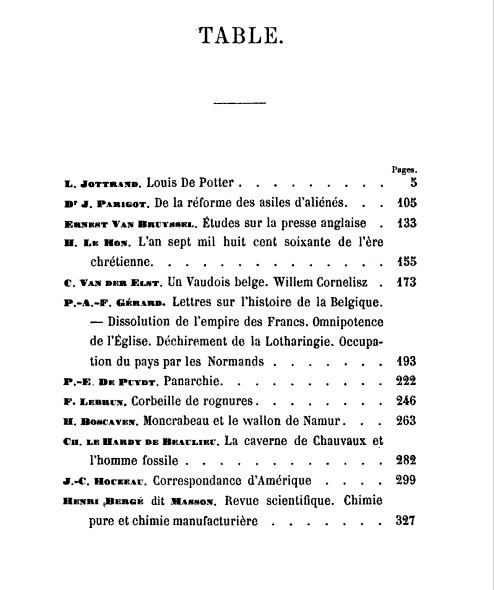
Table of contents of Revue Trimestrielle, Julliet 1860, with the paper "PANARCHIE"

=== Novels ===
- Chevreuse, roman. 1859
- Maudit métier, histoire du Borinage. 1883
- Cent mille francs de dot. 1890

=== Other publications ===
- Biography of his father:

Biographie de M. Jean-Ambroise De Puydt. 60 p.SOCIÉTÉ DES SCIENCES, DES ARTS ET DES LETTRES DU HAINAUT. TROISIÈME SÉRIE. TOME HUITIÈME. ANNÉE 1872.

- Theatre piece:

„Le candidat à la royauté: esquisse en trois tableaux mêlés de couplets“ par Henri-Florent Delmotte, Paul Émile de Puydt, Hippolyte Rousselle, 1831

=== Literature ===
- Léopold Devillers: Puydt (Paul-Émile de). In: Académie Royale des Sciences, des Lettres et des Beaux-Arts de Belgique: Biographie nationale. Bd. 18, Brüssel 1905.
- C. Rousselle: Puydt (de) Paul-Émile. In: Ernest A. Matthieu: Biographie du Hainaut. Bd. 2, Enghien 1903.
- J-F. de Montigny, Tijdschrift van de Antwerpse kring voor familiekunde, Jaargang IX, 1954, p100-115
