= Trust management =

Trust management may refer to:

- Trust management (information system), an abstract system that processes symbolic representations of social trust
- Trust management (managerial science)
- the management of trusts, whereby property is held by one party for the benefit of another
