= Edgar Salin =

German economist (1892–1974)

Edgar Bernhard Jacques Salin (10 February 1892 – 17 May 1974) was a German economist, historian, and translator.

== Biography ==
Born in Frankfurt, Salin studied political economy and jurisprudence, completing his PhD at Heidelberg University in 1913 with a thesis on the economic development of Alaska under the supervision of Alfred Weber. After habilitating at Heidelberg in 1920 with a monograph on the political thought of Plato, Salin taught there and at Kiel before taking up a position as Professor of National Economy at the University of Basel in 1927, which he held until 1962. He served as Chancellor of Basel University. He founded the journal Kyklos at Basel in 1947.

Salin's economic theory integrated influences from John Maynard Keynes, Karl Marx, and Friedrich List. He supported far-reaching economic interventionism. In the 1920s he was associated with the poet Stefan George and his circle, and George's aestheticist outlook influenced Salin throughout his career. He was a proponent of European integration, and after World War II he became a prominent critic of ordoliberalism, particularly the work of Wilhelm Röpke. In addition to his economic research, Salin published a series of translations of Plato. He died on 17 May 1974 in Veytaux, Switzerland.

Salin was awarded the Goethe Plaque of the City of Frankfurt in 1962 and the Commander's Cross of the Order of Merit of the Federal Republic of Germany in 1972.
