= FileSonic =

FileSonic was a file hosting service site which is now defunct.

It was once one of the most popular file locker services which was primarily a consumer based service used from homes, although in a study conducted by security vendor Palo Alto Networks it was found to be in use on a majority of corporate networks.

FileSonic used digital fingerprinting technology to detect prohibited sharing of copyrighted material on its network and had a designated DMCA agent to facilitate takedown requests.

However, on the week following the government raid of the MegaUpload site, FileSonic chose to discontinue the sharing of files and permit only retrieval of files that individual users themselves had uploaded.

Eventually, the changes enacted in the wake of the MegaUpload scandal, which were also enacted by the similarly named competitor FileServe, resulted in FileSonic going out of business.

In the aftermath of the MegaUpload shutdown, the operators of FileSonic feared facing investigations and accusations similar to those directed at MegaUpload's founders, given their promotion of file sharing that potentially infringed upon copyright. Consequently, in the wake of MegaUpload's closure, FileSonic chose to shut down due to the apprehension of facing comparable charges.

Moreover, during that period, there was some legal ambiguity surrounding the classification of digital lockers like MegaUpload. Both FileSonic and RapidShare implemented control measures to combat piracy on their platforms.
