= Kyklos (journal) =

- Discipline: Political economics
- Language: English
- Edited by: Reiner Eichenberger, Alois Stutzer, David Stadelmann

Publication details
- History: 1947-present
- Publisher: John Wiley & Sons
- Frequency: Quarterly
- Impact factor: 1.3 (2024)

Standard abbreviations
- ISO 4: Kyklos

Indexing
- ISSN: 0023-5962 (print); 1467-6435 (web)
- LCCN: 50017368
- OCLC no.: 475940199

Links
- Journal homepage; Online access; Online archive; Information for authors

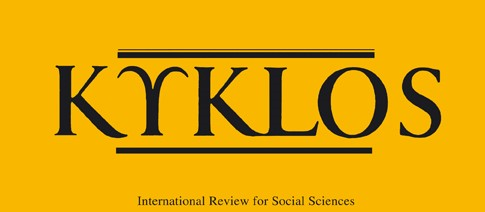
Logo of the cover of a quarterly journal from Wiley & Sons

Kyklos is a quarterly peer-reviewed academic journal published by John Wiley & Sons It was established in 1947 by Edgar Salin and is attached to the Faculty of Business and Economics at the University of Basel. The journal views economics as a social science and favours contributions dealing with issues relevant to contemporary society, as well as economic policy applications.

The editors of the journal are the economists Reiner Eichenberger, Alois Stutzer and David Stadelmann. Honorary Editors are Bruno S. Frey and René L. Frey.

== Abstracting and indexing ==
The journal is abstracted and indexed in Scopus and the Social Sciences Citation Index. According to the Journal Citation Reports, the journal has a 2024 impact factor of 1.3, ranking it 165 out of 353 journals in the category "Economics".
