= Matt A. Barreto =

American political scientist, author, Democratic political consultant

Matthew Alejandro Barreto, Ph.D. is a political scientist, author, and co-founder of the national polling and research firm Barreto Segura Partners Research (BSP Research).

Barreto is currently Professor of Political Science and Chicana/o Studies at the University of California, Los Angeles where his teaching and research focuses on Latino political behavior and public opinion. In 2024 Barreto was a pollster and advisor to the Harris-Walz presidential campaign according to the New York Times and NBC News, focusing on Hispanic and Latino voters. In 2020 he was a pollster for the Biden Presidential campaign and in 2021 was named senior advisor to the Biden White House-aligned group Building Back Together.

In 2007 Barreto co-founded the polling firm Latino Decisions with Dr. Gary Segura and Pacific Market Research, as a political consulting firm specializing in Latino voter behavior. In 2021 Barreto and Segura left Latino Decisions to form a new Latino-owned political consulting firm, Barreto Segura Research Partners (BSP Research, LLC).

As an academic researcher, Barreto has prepared independent reports and given testimony in several lawsuits challenging voter identification laws in Wisconsin, Pennsylvania, Texas, North Carolina, and North Dakota and his research has been cited by State and Federal courts in striking down voter identification laws. His 2013 scholarly book, Change They Can't Believe In: The Tea Party and Reactionary Politics in America, co-authored with Dr. Christopher Parker won an American Political Science Association Best Book Award, and his 2014 book Latino America: How America's Most Dynamic Population is Poised to Transform the Politics of the Nation was reviewed by the Wall Street Journal, Washington Post and Publishers Weekly, and was featured in interviews on MSNBC, PBS, C-SPAN, NPR, and Univision.

== Early life ==
Barreto was born in San Juan, Puerto Rico and raised in Kansas City, Missouri and Topeka, Kansas. According to the book Latino America (Public Affairs Press), Barreto is Hispanic-American of Peruvian heritage. Barreto received a bachelor's degree in Political Science from Eastern New Mexico University in 1998 and earned a Ph.D. in Political Science from the University of California, Irvine in 2005.

Barreto started his career in research and polling at the Tomas Rivera Policy Institute at the Claremont Colleges in 1999 where he implemented public opinion surveys of Hispanic voters and co-authored reports on Latino political behavior in the 2000 Presidential election. During his time at the Tomas Rivera Policy Institute he co-authored (with Dr. Nathan Woods) one of the first-ever statistical analyses of the California voter file merged against the U.S. Census Spanish Surname index, in the publication "Voting Patterns and the Dramatic Growth of the Latino Electorate in Los Angeles County, 1994-1998." Barreto, Segura and Woods eventually published a detailed statistical analysis of their voter file research in The American Political Science Journal.

== Career ==
=== Political Consultant ===
In 2007 Barreto co-founded the polling and research firm Latino Decisions with Dr. Gary Segura, and in partnership with Pacific Market Research in Renton, Washington. At the time Barreto and Segura were both professors at the University of Washington and conducting public opinion research among Hispanics. Previously, Barreto and Segura had collaborated on Latino polling research for the Tomas Rivera Policy Institute at the Claremont Colleges. As of the November 2020 election, Latino Decisions was regarded as "the leading Latino political opinion research group" in the United States. The Austin-American Statesmen called Latino Decisions "one of the most trusted Latino polling services in the nation," and Time Magazine said "the polling firm Latino Decisions is the gold standard of Latino-American polling." In 2021 Barreto and Segura left Latino Decisions to form a new Latino-owned political consulting firm, Barreto Segura Partners. In 2024 Barreto was a pollster and advisor to the Harris-Walz presidential campaign according to the New York Times and NBC News, focusing on Hispanic and Latino voters. According to Politico Magazine, Barreto was among key staff and consultants who met directly with Vice President Harris at her home in February 2024 as part of the campaign. Barreto was quoted in El Pais in October 2024 explaining that "the transition from Biden to Harris on the Democratic ticket created a wave of enthusiasm and support among Latino voters."

As a political consultant and pollster Barreto implemented large projects for the National Association of Latino Elected Officials, National Council of La Raza, Latino Victory Project, America's Voice, AFL-CIO, SEIU and many other political advocacy groups. Barreto’s research was recognized in the 30 Latinos key to the 2012 election by Politic365, which said Barreto's "polling firm published key polls and stats throughout the campaign, consistently, that shaped the way the campaigns did their work.". The Huffington Post named Barreto one of the top 15 leading Latino pundits noting that he was "the pollster that has his finger on the pulse of the Latino electorate." In August 2015 NBC News reported that Barreto was hired by the Hillary Clinton presidential campaign to run polling and focus groups on Latino voters. Frank Sharry, an immigration reform advocate working in Washington D.C. "praised the work of Barreto" as having "developed a methodologically-sound, data-driven approach to polling Latino voters...the Clinton campaign is fortunate - and smart - to have them on board". In 2016 he was a consultant on Latino polling for U.S. Senator Michael Bennet in Colorado and Catherine Cortez-Masto in Nevada, both of whom won their elections to the U.S. Senate. Cortez-Masto was the first Hispanic woman elected to the U.S. Senate.

Barreto has been invited to brief the U.S. Senate, the White House, Congressional Committees, and has been a keynote speaker at many of the major Hispanic association conferences including NALEO, LULAC, Congressional Hispanic Caucus, NCLR and others. In 2016 he was a featured speaker at the Aspen Ideas Festival in Aspen, Colorado.

During 2020 Barreto was hired by the Biden Presidential campaign to conduct polling and advise on Latino voter outreach. Following the campaign, the Latino voter outreach plan was credited with delivering the states of Nevada and Arizona to the Biden-Harris ticket. While some media outlets focused on the gains Trump made with Latino voters in Miami, Barreto claimed that media framing of the Latino vote in 2020 was inaccurate and that Biden had mobilized record turnout among Hispanic voters, stating in an interview with Martha Ramirez: "Journalists, mostly white, and their white editors, became fascinated by vote data in Miami early on election night that showed Trump improving among Cubans and South Americans. Those of us carefully following the Latino vote had seen this trend all along and were not surprised. Then, instead of reporting on how Latino voters were a very important part of the Biden coalition, and provided the margin of victory due to very robust voter turnout in states like Arizona and Nevada, the media decided to go on a full-fledged assault about how Latinos were fleeing the Democratic Party. This is complete nonsense. What we saw in 2020 was first and foremost an incredible voter turnout among Latinos; our ballots cast grew by about 30% since 2016 compared to 15% growth for the country as a whole. Latino voters came out in huge numbers in Maricopa and Pima counties in Arizona for Biden. Latino voters, mostly Puerto Rican, came out in big numbers for Biden in Philadelphia. Latino voters came out in record-breaking numbers for Biden, and then Warnock and Ossoff in Georgia. These stories were ignored in favor of the Miami and RGV fixation of the Latino swing to Trump. It was bad reporting all around." In February 2021 Barreto was named senior advisor to the Biden White House aligned C4, Building Back Together. As part of the outreach work of Building Back Together, Barreto helped direct the Latino "always on" plan to engage the Latino community and promote events such as Vice President Harris meeting with DACA recipients and has implemented polling for the White House.

In 2024, an analysis by Roge Karma of The Atlantic found that Barreto's polling had been inaccurate in three consecutive presidential elections.

=== Professor of Political Science ===
Matt A. Barreto is Professor of Political Science and Chicana/o Studies at the University of California, Los Angeles where his teaching and research focuses on Latino political behavior and public opinion. He is currently the Faculty Director of the UCLA Voting Rights Project and was previously the founding Faculty Director of the UCLA Latino Politics and Policy Institute. Before moving to UCLA he taught at the University of Washington.

Barreto has published four academic books and more than 80 peer-reviewed academic papers on the topics of American politics, Latino politics, political methodology and voting rights.

==== Academic Research ====
Barreto has published four books and more than 80 academic articles and book chapters on the topics of racial and ethnic politics in America, most often focusing on Latinos political behavior. According to Google Scholar, his research has been cited more than 6,000 times in other academic research articles and books. His early research on Latino voting patterns argued that Latino voters do not necessarily have lower rates of voting than other racial groups, but instead receive less campaign investment. When campaigns conduct outreach to Latino voters, Barreto has documented that they turnout to vote at equal or higher rates than non-Latinos. Barreto has also received recognition for his research on the Tea Party movement, co-authored with Dr. Christopher Parker, which resulted in Change They Can't Believe In: The Tea Party and Reactionary Politics in America which won the American Political Science Association Best Book Award for Race, Ethnicity, Politics in 2014. Their book argued that Tea Party supporters were not typical mainstream conservatives upset about government spending, but rather they were reactionary conservatives who were motivated by changing demographics in the country and the election of Barack Obama as the first African American president. While many other studies have now come to this same conclusion, Barreto and Parker were the first to empirically document this trend as early as April 2010 in a blog post on 538 written by contributor Thomas Schaller. Barreto has also received attention for his work with Karam Dana on original survey data collection of American Muslims. Barreto and Dana collaborated on the 2007 Muslim American Public Opinion Survey which interviewed 1,410 American Muslims about their views and attitudes towards politics in the United States. A key finding of their study was that the more religious Muslims, and those more involved in the mosque, were more likely to become incorporated and participate in American civics and politics

Barreto served two terms on the Board of the American National Election Study (ANES) for the 2012 and 2016 national studies. In 2008 he was awarded a National Science Foundation grant to implement a Latino oversample on the American National Election Study, which was the first time the ANES included a large sample of Latinos in their survey, which continued in 2012 and 2016.

=== Voting Rights Act Expert ===
In 2009 Barreto published one of the first academic studies on the impact of voter identification laws (co-authored with Dr. Gabriel Sanchez and Dr. Stephen Nuño). His early research documented that racial minorities and low-income citizens had lower rates of government-issued photo identification and could face barriers to voting under strict voter ID laws. As more states passed voter ID laws Barreto and Sanchez were retained by the ACLU and other lawyers challenging these laws to provide expert reports and testify at trial about their research findings.

In Texas, Federal Judge Nelva Gonzales Ramos wrote that Barreto and Sanchez are "experts in survey research, particularly in the field of racial and ethnic politics", who "conducted a four-week survey of over 2,300 eligible voters in Texas, and concluded that African-American eligible voters are 1.78 times more likely to lack qualified SB 14 ID than Anglo eligible voters. The observed racial disparity was magnified with Hispanic eligible voters as they are 2.42 times more likely to lack qualified SB 14 ID compared to Anglo eligible voters." (pg 57). In examining the evidence put forth by Barreto and Sanchez, the court wrote that the experts "are impressively credentialed and who explained their data, methodologies, and other facts upon which they relied in clear terms according to generally accepted and reliable scientific methods for their respective fields. The Court finds that approximately 608,470 registered voters in Texas lack proper SB 14 ID. The Court also finds that SB 14 disproportionately impacts both African-Americans and Hispanics in Texas." (pg 59).

In 2016 Barreto and Sanchez conducted a survey and authored an expert report in North Dakota which found Native Americans were disadvantaged by the state's voter ID law. According to their report 23.5% of Native Americans lacked a valid ID compared to 12% of non-Native Americans in North Dakota. In August 2016 a Federal Court issued a preliminary injunction against the voter identification law based on Barreto's research. In his ruling, Judge Daniel L. Hovland wrote "The Defendant has provided no legislative testimony or findings to counter the Barreto/Sanchez Survey, nor in any manner challenged any of the evidence the Plaintiffs have submitted...Given the thorough and unrefuted record developed by the Plaintiffs in this case, and the lack of any evidence presented by the Defendant to the contrary, the Court gives the findings of the Barreto/Sanchez Survey, and the other studies and data presented by the Plaintiffs, considerable weight". (pg 9)

Similar to the outcomes in Texas and North Dakota, a state court in Pennsylvania struck down a voter ID law. As in the Texas and North Dakota cases, Barreto worked with Sanchez on a survey and expert report which documented that the Pennsylvania voter ID law had a discriminatory effect and would negatively impact hundreds of thousands of potential voters. In January 2014 after an appeal by the state, Judge Bernard L. McGinley ruled against the voter ID law. According to the decision issued by Judge McGinley, the Court "had a high degree of confidence in Professor Barreto’s survey results and that those results corroborate that hundreds of thousands of voters lack a compliant ID" (pg 10).

The voter ID law in Wisconsin has received considerable legal attention since 2011. Barreto and Sanchez authored an expert report based on a survey in Wisconsin. In his 2014 decisions against the voter ID law, Federal Judge Lynn Adelman stated that "it is absolutely clear that Act 23 will prevent more legitimate votes from being cast than fraudulent votes," (pg 38) and after careful review of Barreto's survey stated "I remain convinced that his results support the conclusion that Blacks and Latinos are less likely than whites to possess qualifying forms of ID." (pg 57). Adelman ruled that the voter ID law violated the Federal Voting Rights Act, Section 2. The state of Wisconsin appealed the decision, and after extensive back-and-forth, the law was upheld and allowed to stand in place for the 2016 presidential election.

As a result of his role in these high-profile lawsuits, Barreto is considered a leading expert on the impact of voter identification laws.
