= Margit Osterloh =

German and Swiss economist (born 1943)

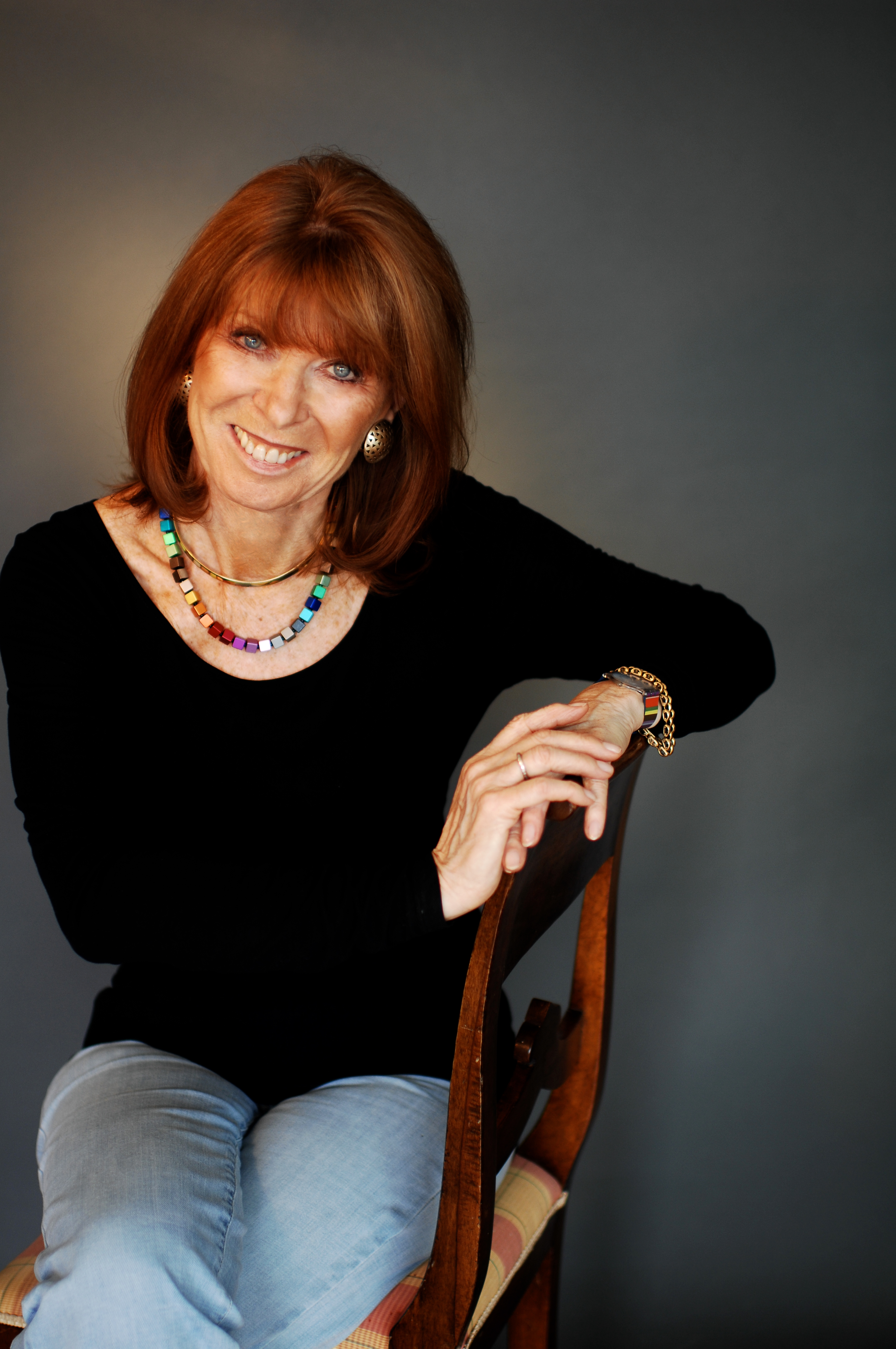
Osterloh in 2017

Margit Osterloh (born 23 July 1943 in Brandenburg an der Havel, Germany) is a German and Swiss economist.

== Research ==
Osterloh’s research areas include: Organizational Theory, Theory of the Firm, Innovation and Technology Management, Process Management, Knowledge Management, Trust Management, Philosophy of Science, Gender Economics, Corporate Governance, Research Governance, Migration Policy and Aleatoric Democracy. In the media she expresses her opinion on the following research topics:

=== Management Pay ===
Osterloh advocates a cutback of bonus payments in upper management. She argues that pay for performance hampers creativity and intrinsic motivation.

=== Academic Rankings ===
In August 2012, Osterloh, together with Alfred Kieser, launched an appeal to other business professors to boycott the upcoming Handelsblatt Betriebswirte-Ranking (Handelsblatt Ranking of Professors in Business Economics). In various articles she argues, together with Alfred Kieser and Bruno S. Frey, against rankings and impact factors as a quality criterion for scholars in academia.

=== Women in leadership positions ===
Osterloh advocates quota and she also argues for partial random selection of women in leadership positions out of a carefully selected pool as a counter-measure to reduce women's, on average, higher aversion to competition versus men.

=== Migration issues ===
Margit Osterloh published, together with Bruno S. Frey, a much-noticed article in the Frankfurter Allgemeine Zeitung. In analogy to the cooperative model, they propose that refugees acquire a share certificate of the state in order to enter the country. In return they get permission to work in the labor market. If a refugee is recognized as a political asylum seeker, the fee paid for the share certificate will be reimbursed. The currently inhumane and life-threatening defense against refugees and the exploitation by criminal traffickers is thereby reduced. Refugees receive a calculable perspective and incentives for integration. The proposal offers advantages for the countries of destination and origin, as well as for migrants.

=== Revival of controlled randomness as a decision-making mechanism ===
Together with Bruno S. Frey, Osterloh argues for a return to random or aleatoric elements such as those used in Classical Athens and up to Modern Age in numerous European communities. This improves - similar to quality circles in enterprises - the activation of knowledge, the engagement of the population, and results in a strengthening of participation as well as in a reduction of inequality dominance of the elites.
