= FOCJ =

Functional Overlapping Competing Jurisdictions (FOCJ, also Functional, Overlapping and Competing Jurisdictions) is a moderate form of panarchy advocated by Swiss economists Bruno Frey and Reiner Eichenberger.

Under FOCJ, government operations are divided into multiple organisations each known as a FOCUS. FOCJ are:

- Functional, as they deal with one matter only, such as education, policing, or roads.
- Overlapping, since the individuals or region covered by a FOCUS providing one function might be covered by multiple FOCJ in respect of another function.
- Competing, as FOCJ providing the same function compete with one another. For some functions, each individual may choose which FOCUS will apply to them; however, if the function is territorially bound, each town votes to select its FOCUS. For example, an FOCJ nation may have three police forces, with each town voting as to which of the three shall provide its policing.
- A jurisdiction, because a FOCUS is a separate political unit, and may, for example, levy taxes upon the individuals or towns selecting it.
