= Bruno Frey =

Swiss economist

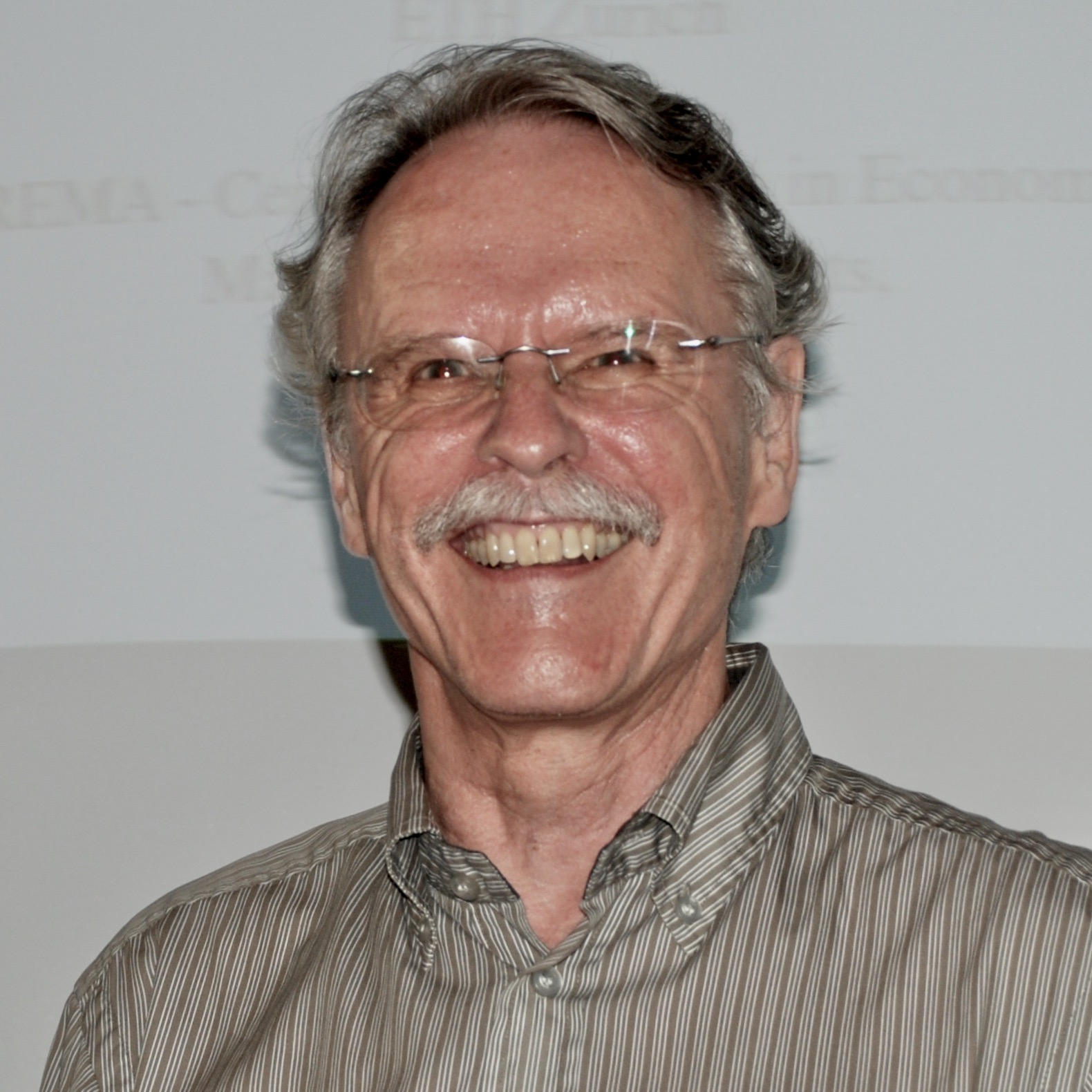
Bruno Frey 2010

Bruno S. Frey (born 4 May 1941 in Basel, Switzerland) is a Swiss economist and visiting professor for Political Economy at the University of Basel. Frey's research topics include political economy and happiness economics, with his published work including concepts derived from Psychology, Sociology, Jurisprudence, History, Arts, and Theology.

== Career and academic positions ==
Frey studied economics at the University of Basel and at the University of Cambridge, obtaining a doctorate in economics in 1965. From 1969 to 2010, Frey was an associate professor of economics at the University of Basel, from 1977 to 2012 a professor of economics at the University of Zurich, and since 1969 has held editor positions at Kyklos, a Swiss journal on political economy. Since 2004 Frey has been a director of research for the Center for Research in Economics, Management and the Arts (CREMA). Starting from 2010 until 2013, Frey was appointed to the Warwick Business School in the role of a Dinstinguished Professor of Behavioural Science.

Frey was appointed to the Copenhagen Consensus expert commission in 2004, alongside four Nobel Prize winners. The main goal of this commission was to assess priorities for addressing the main challenges facing humanity, including hunger, AIDS, water access, trade barriers, corruption, and global warming.

In July 2011, the University of Zurich established a commission to investigate allegations of publication misconduct (self-plagiarism) by Frey and his co-authors. In October of the same year the commission reported that Frey had committed misconduct, namely self-plagiarism. In July 2012, the Faculty of Business, Economics and Management at the University of Zurich decided to not extend the employment contract Frey had after having become emeritus professor.

In 2012, the government of Bhutan appointed Frey to an international group of experts to investigate "a new development paradigm designed to nurture human happiness and the well-being of all life on earth."

== Influence ==
According to the RePEc-Ranking from October 2015, he is listed as the 14th most cited European economist. Additionally, the Swiss newspaper, Neue Zürcher Zeitung, publishes regularly a rating measuring the academic success and the public perception in the media and politics of economists. In this rating, he was appointed as the 3rd most influential economist in Switzerland in 2014 and 2015.

In a recent publication from Miha Dominko and Miroslav Verbič titled "The Economics of Subjective Well-Being: A Bibliometric Analysis" and published in the Journal of Happiness Studies in 2019, the authors examined the development of subjective well-being research. Their result from Table 3. "50 most cited articles in the economics of subjective well-being research" B. S. Frey and A. Stutzer's article "What can economists learn from happiness research?" was placed in the very first place.

=== Rankings ===
Media – According to "Economists’ Impact Ranking" (Ökonomen-Einfluss-Ranking) in NZZ (Neue Zürcher Zeitung) of 21 September 2019, Bruno S. Frey achieved Rank 4 in Switzerland (in terms of research output: Rank 2) and according to "Germany's most influential Economists" in F.A.Z (Frankfurter Allgemeine Zeitung) of 21 September 2019: Rank 5 in Germany. In Handelsblatt’s “Economics Ranking 2019", 16 September 2019, he was placed in terms of "lifetime achievement" on the 1st Rank. In December 2023, Wirtschaftswoche listed Frey as number 1 in the ranking for academic lifetime achievement for economists from Germany, Austria and Switzerland.

According to the research ranking website research.com, he is ranked worldwide 16th in the Economics and Finance category and third in the Political Science category.

== Published work ==
Frey's published research has included topics related to behavioural economics (including motivational crowding effects), the economics of awards, political economics, the economics of happiness, the effects of democracy upon society, corporate governance, community enterprises, and the economics of war.

Frey is the author of more than a dozen books in English and/or German (including a number of translations into French, Spanish, Portuguese, Galician, Italian, Japanese, Korean and Chinese) and more than 300 articles in professional academic journals.

Concerning the role of direct democracy, he developed (together with Reiner Eichenberger) a functionally oriented form of federalism called Functional Overlapping Competing Jurisdiction (FOCJ). He considers both direct democracy and federalism as trend-setting institutions of the future.

Frey has also contributed to the organisation of theatres, operas, and museums, as well as the return on investment in works of art. He finds that the latter are less financially rewarding compared to other investments. Such investments are nevertheless made because a psychological return also takes place in the process. According to the economics publication database IDEAS, Frey is a world leader in research in the field of cultural economics.

As a further contribution to cultural economics, Bruno S. Frey has published a book entitled "Venice is Everywhere". The phenomenon of "overtourism" is treated as a central theme. In this context, economic aspects such as externalities or behavioural incentives and their role in the institutional framework are discussed. In addition, Frey (with Andre Briviba) has published two academic papers on the topic (Revived Originals - A proposal to deal with cultural overtourism; A policy proposal to deal with excessive cultural tourism).

As an alternative to the established simple majority rule, Frey proposes the flexible decision-making rule. This change is necessary because even established direct democratic procedures do not allow for full participation. This is because when decisions are made by simple majorities, the concerns of those outvoted are neglected. Flexible decision-making rules are intended to overcome precisely this disadvantage of majority governments. They work as follows: The electorate votes on a proposal. The losing opinion is not completely excluded, as was previously the case, but is integrated into the future solution to the extent of its partial success. For example, if the result of a vote to lower the voting age from 18 to 16 is 65% against and 35% in favour, young people would previously be denied any right to vote. With the new regulation, on the other hand, it could be agreed that young people under the age of 18 would not have full voting rights, but would still receive 35% of the weight of a full vote.

== Self-plagiarism ==
During 2010 and 2011 Frey, with co-authors Benno Torgler and David Savage, published four articles concerning the Titanic disaster in four different journals. Concerning these articles, in 2011 Frey and his co-authors were accused of self-plagiarism. On 3 May 2011 David Autor, editor of the Journal of Economic Perspectives, wrote a public letter to Frey claiming "very substantial overlap between these articles and your JEP publication. Indeed, to my eye, they are substantively identical." Pointing out that the other articles were not cited, Autor further wrote that "your conduct in this matter [is] ethically dubious and disrespectful to the American Economic Association, the Journal of Economic Perspectives and the JEP's readers." In a public response, Frey accepted these accusations and offered his apologies, writing, "[i]t was a grave mistake on our part for which we deeply apologize. It should never have happened. This is deplorable."

== Academic honours ==
- 1996: Raymond Vernon Memorial Award (shared with Felix Oberholzer-Gee); Association for Public Policy Analysis and Management, USA 1998: Fellow der Public Choice Society
- 1998: Honorary Doctorate from the University of St. Gallen and University of Gothenburg (Sweden)
- 1998: Fellow der Public Choice Society
- 2004: Elected Fellow of the European Economic Association
- 2005: Corresponding Fellow, Royal Society of Edinburgh
- 2005: Distinguished CESifo Fellow Oxford University Press
- 2007: Gustav Stolper Prize, Verein für Socialpolitik
- 2008: Friedrich von Wieser-Preis, Prague Conference on Political Economy
- 2009: Honorary Doctorate from the University of Brussels
- 2010: Honorary Fellow, Association for Cultural Economics International (ACEI)
- 2012: Röpke Prize for Civil Society, Liberal Institute

== Selected books ==
- Frey, Bruno S., 1972. Umweltökonomie. Vandenhoeck & Ruprecht, Göttingen.
- Frey, Bruno S., 1978. Modern Political Economy. Halsted Press, Wiley, New York.
- Frey, Bruno S., 1983. Democratic Economic Policy. A theoretical introduction. Martin Robertson, Oxford.
- Frey, Bruno S., 1984. International Political Economics. Basil Blackwell, Oxford und New York.
- Frey, Bruno S. and Werner W. Pommerehne, 1989. Muses and Markets. Explorations in the Economics of the Arts. Basil Blackwell, Oxford.
- Frey, Bruno S., 1992. Economics as a Science of Human Behaviour. Towards a New Social Science Paradigm. Kluwer Academic Publishers, Boston/Dordrecht/London.
- Frey, Bruno S., 1997. Not just for the money. An economic theory of personal motivation. E. Elgar, Cheltenham.
- Frey, Bruno S. and Reiner Eichenberger, 1999. The New Democratic Federalism for Europe. Functional, Overlapping and Competing Jurisdictions. Edward Elgar Publishing Limited, Cheltenham.
- Frey, Bruno S., 2000. Arts & Economics. Analysis & Cultural Policy. Springer Verlag, Berlin, Heidelberg, New York.
- Frey, Bruno S., 2001. Inspiring Economics: Human Motivation in Political Economy. Edward Elgar Publishing Ltd., Cheltenham, UK and Northampton, Mass.
- Frey, Bruno S. and Alois Stutzer, 2002. Happiness and economics. How the economy and institutions affect well-being. Princeton University Press, Princeton (N.J.).
- Frey, Bruno S., 2004. Dealing with Terrorism: Stick or Carrot. Edward Elgar Publishing Ltd., Cheltenham, UK and Northhampton, Mass.
- Frey, Bruno S., 2008. Happiness: A Revolution in Economics. The MIT Press, Cambridge, MA und London, England 2008.
- Frey, Bruno S., and Jana Gallus, 2017. Honours versus money. Oxford: Oxford University Press.
- Frey, Bruno S., and David Iselin, 2017. Economic Ideas You Should Forget. Springer International Publishing.
- Frey, Bruno S., 2018. Economics of Happiness. Springer International Publishing.
- Frey, Bruno S., 2019. Economics of Art and Culture. Springer International Publishing.
- Frey, Bruno S., and Christoph A. Schaltegger, 2019. Economic Ideas You Should Read and Remember. Springer International Publishing
- Frey, Bruno S., and Christian Ulbrich, 2024. Automated Democracy - Die Neuverteilung von Macht und Einfluss im digitalen Staat. Verlag Herder

== Selected articles ==
- How Government Bond Yields Reflect Wartime Events: The Case of the Nordic Market (with Daniel Waldenstrom) In: Sovereign Debt: From Safety to Default (Robert W. Kolb, ed.), 2011, Wiley, Hoboken N.J., pp 279–286 (Part V: Historical Perspectives).
- Motivation and Awards (mit Jana Gallus) In: The Cambridge Handbook of Psychology and Economic Behaviour, 2nd edition, ed. Alan Lewis, Cambridge University Press, Cambridge, 2018, Part VII – New Horizons, pp 697–712.
- Economics and Well-Being In: The SAGE Handbook of Personality and Individual Differences, eds. Virgil Zeigler-Hill and Todd K. Shackelford, SAGE Publication Ltd., London, 2018, Volume 3 (Applications of Personality and Individual Differences, Part III (Personality in the Workplace), pp 552–567.
- Cooperatives Instead of Migration Partnerships (with Margit Osterloh) In: Analyse & Kritik, 2018, 40(2), pp 201–225.
- A Pragmatic Approach to Migration (Reply to comments re. Cooperatives Instead of Migration Partnerships), (with Margit Osterloh) In: Analyse & Kritik, 2018, 40(2), pp 329–336.
- Public Choice and Happiness (with Alois Stutzer) In: The Oxford Handbook of Public Choice, Vol. 1. Roger D. Congleton, Bernard Grofman, Stefan Voigt (eds). Oxford: Oxford University Press, 2019, pp 779–795.
- Commitment to Pay Taxes: Results from Field and Laboratory Experiments (Ann-Kathrin Koessler, Benno Torgler, Lars P. Feld) In: European Economic Review 115, June 2019, pp 78–98.
- Volksvertreter per Los – Können Zufallsverfahren das Regierungshandeln verbessern? In: zfo – Zeitschrift Führung+ Organisation 3/2019, pp 175–178, https://www.zfo.de/.
- Migration Policy – What can we Learn from Cooperatives? (with Margit Osterloh) In: Althammer Jörg, Neumärker Bernhard, Nothelle-Wildfeuer Ursula (eds) (2019). Solidarity in Open Societies. Springer VS, Wiesbaden, Chapter 2: Applications, pp 267–282, (online first 8 June 2019) 22 July 2019.
- Political Economy of Statistics: Manipulating Data (2020). SSRN http://dx.doi.org/10.2139/ssrn.3705352.
- with Andre Briviba: Revived Originals – A proposal to deal with cultural overtourism (2020). Tourism Economics. https://doi.org/10.1177/1354816620945407
- Festivals. Edward Elgar Publishing. Handbook of Cultural Economics (2020).
- Happiness Policy: Technocratic or Democratic? University of California Press (2020). https://doi.org/10.1525/gp.2020.12041.
- with Anthony Gullo: Sic transit gloria mundi: What remains of famous economists after their deaths? Springer (2020). https://doi.org/10.1007/s11192-020-03393-w
- (with Margit Osterloh): How to avoid borrowed plumes in academia. North-Holland (2020). https://doi.org/10.1016/j.respol.2019.103831
- with Lasse Steiner, Lisa Leinert: Economics, Religion and Happiness. Springer (2020). https://doi.org/10.1007/978-3-658-16205-4_3
- with Andre Briviba: Two types of cultural economics. International Review of Economics (2022). https://doi.org/10.1007/s12232-022-00410-7
- with Andre Briviba, Louis Moser and Sandro Bieri: Governments manipulate official Statistics: Institutions matter. European Journal of Political Economy (2024). https://doi.org/10.1016/j.ejpoleco.2024.102523
- with Andre Briviba: Caring for Minorities: The Flexible Decision Rule. Economics & Politics (2024). https://doi.org/10.1111/ecpo.12305
