= Nicolai J. Foss =

Danish economist and organisational theorist

Nicolai Juul Foss (born 1964) is a Danish organizational theorist, and scholar of entrepreneurship and strategy. He is currently a professor at the Copenhagen Business School where he has spent most of his career. Foss' main contribution to organization theory is through the micro-foundational perspective in organization theory and management—examining how individual behaviors aggregate to affect the behavior of larger groups and organizations. He was created a Knight of the Order of the Dannebrog in 2015.

== Biography ==
Nicolai Juul Foss is Professor of Strategy at the Department of Strategy and Innovation at the Copenhagen Business School (CBS), an Honorary Adjunct Professor, Department of Marketing and Management, University of Southern Denmark, and External Chair, Danish Institute for Advanced Studies, 2020–2025.

Foss held the Rodolfo de Benedetti Chair of Entrepreneurship at the Bocconi University, but assumed a professorship at the CBS starting 2020. He has held part-time and visiting professorships at the Warwick Business School, Norwegian School of Economics, Lund University, Luiss Guido Carli-Roma, ESC Rennes, and Agder University. Foss was assistant, associate, and full professor of strategy at CBS from 1993 to 2016 and served as department head at CBS for 10 years. He has served on the board of directors of the Strategic Management Society, of which he is also a Fellow, is one of the very few Danish social science members of Academia Europaea, and was a Clarivate Highly Cited Researcher for 2018 and 2019.

Foss has written on many different subjects, including the theory of the firm in management research, methodological issues in management research (particularly the role of microfoundations), organizational antecedents of entrepreneurship, the history and content of entrepreneurship research, the Austrian School of Economics, human resource management and other subjects.

Encompassing 216 journal articles, 102 book chapters and 26 books (edited as well as monographs), his work has been published in the Academy of Management Review, Academy of Management Journal, Organization Science, Strategic Management Journal, and several other leading journals. He has published books with leading publishers, such as Cambridge University Press and Oxford University Press.

Foss writes a monthly column in the Danish newspaper Berlingske under the column titled "Forstå Business" ("Understand Business").

== Education ==
Foss obtained his PhD in 1993 from the Copenhagen Business School.

== Selected publications ==
- Nicholas S. Argyres, Alfredo De Massis, Nicolai Foss, Federico Frattini, Geoffrey Jones, and Brian S. Silverman. 2020. “History-informed Strategy Research: The promise of History and Historical Research Methods in Advancing Strategy Scholarship." Strategic Management Journal, 41: 343–368.
- Nicolai Foss and Torben Pedersen. 2019. “Microfoundations in International Management Research: The Case of Knowledge Sharing in Multinational Corporations.” Journal of International Business Studies, 50: 1594–1623.
- Jay B Barney, Nicolai Foss, and Jacob Lyngsie. 2018. “The Role of Senior Management in Opportunity Formation: Direct Involvement or Reactive Selection?” Strategic Management Journal, 39(5): 1325–49.
- Jacob Lyngsie and Nicolai Foss. 2017. “The More, the Merrier? The Role of Gender in Explaining Entrepreneurial Outcomes in Established Firms.” Strategic Management Journal, 38: 487–505.
- Nicolai Foss, Francesco Rullani and Lars Frederiksen. 2016. “Problem-solving Behaviors in Community Forms.” Strategic Management Journal, 37: 1189–1210.
- Nicolai Foss and Libby Weber. 2016 “Putting Opportunism in the Back Seat: Bounded Rationality, Costly Conflict and Hierarchical Forms.” Academy of Management Review, 41: 41–79.
- Teppo Felin, Nicolai Foss and Rob Ployhart. 2015. “Microfoundations for Management Research.” Academy of Management Annals 9: 575–632.
- Nicolai Foss and Niklas Hallberg. 2014. “How Symmetrical Assumptions Facilitate Theoretical Advance in Strategic Management: the Case of the Resource-based View.” Strategic Management Journal, 35: 903–913.
- Nicolai Foss, Jacob Lyngsie and Shaker Zahra. 2013. “The Role of External Knowledge Sources and Organizational Design in the Process of Opportunity Exploitation.” Strategic Management Journal, 34: 1453–1471.
- Nicholas Argyres, Teppo Felin, Nicolai Foss, and Todd Zenger. 2012. “The Organizational Economics of Organizational Capability: a Research Agenda”. Organization Science 23: 1213–1226.
- Mia Reinholt, Torben Pedersen, and Nicolai Foss. 2011. “Why a Central Network Position Isn't Enough: the Moderating Roles of Motivation and Ability for Knowledge Sharing in Employee Networks.” Academy of Management Journal, 54: 1277–1297.
- Siegwart Lindenberg and Nicolai Foss. 2011. „Managing Motivation for Joint Production: The Role of Goal Framing and Governance Mechanisms.” Academy of Management Review 36: 500–525.
- Nicolai Foss, Keld Laursen and Torben Pedersen) “Linking Customer Interaction and Innovation: The Mediating Role of New Organizational Practices,” Organization Science, 22: 980–999. (2011).
