= FileServe =

Defunct file hosting service

- Website type: File hosting service
- Dissolved: March 30, 2017; 9 years ago
- Owner: FileServe Ltd.
- Commercial: Yes
- Registration: Required
- Launched: March 14, 2010; 16 years ago
- Current status: Defunct

FileServe was an online internet file hosting service.

FileServe, together with another file hosting service site, Megaupload, have terminated their services for Hong Kong by blocking IP addresses from accessing their websites and files.

== Blocks and blacklisting ==
- On 16–18 November 2011, Virgin Media customers were unable to download from the site after it was blacklisted by the Internet Watch Foundation due to a single upload containing illegal content.
- In November 2011, FileServe was added to Google's blacklist for auto-complete and instant search services together with several other file locker sites.
- On 22 January 2012, Fileserve and many of its sister sites disabled their file sharing feature, making it so its users can only download files they have personally uploaded to their own accounts.
- On 31 January 2012, Fileserve re-enabled its file sharing feature on its website so many users who were still active on the site can now continue to share their files with others. During the time when file sharing was disabled, many of the thousands of files and users of FileServe have been deleted either by the end user or by Fileserve themselves for breach of copyright and (In The End-User Case) loss of Fileserve's affiliate program. Many of its sister sites such as Filesonic still don't allow file sharing through their systems. There is currently no word on when or if Filesonic or its sister sites will re-enable their file sharing feature in the future.
- On 1 April 2012, Fileserve once again made it so users can only download files they have personally uploaded to their own accounts.
