= Trust management (managerial science) =

Trust management (management by trust, management through trust) deals with how people or groups determine who or what to trust.

== Definitions ==
Trust management can be conceptualized in two ways, the process by which an individual becomes trustworthy and second, the process of assessing the reliability of other individuals. Both concepts of trust are considered as equally significant in the context of trust management.

Becoming trustworthy on a personal level is a significant criterion of success and survival as it allows cooperation and collaboration between the individual and other people. Thus it is an important principle as it common for a majority of people attempt to build up a "fake image" of their reliability for personal benefits. Having the ability to assess the reliability of other individuals is equally as important as being trustworthy oneself. Through being able to detect reliability, one can make better decisions and employ trust in the right people.

Taking these two aspects together, the following definition of trust management can be formulated:

“The activities of creating systems and methods that allow relying parties to:

1. Make assessments and decisions regarding the dependability of potential transactions involving risk
2. Allow players and system owners to increase and correctly represent the reliability of themselves and their systems.”

Trust is a container concept used in a broad variety of disciplines. Much work has been done in the field of psychology, sociology, economics, political sciences, philosophy, anthropology and management sciences. Simply defining "trust" is a milestone in the management sciences. One can barely speak of coherent research in the field of trust and trust management.

For trust management defined above, there are some crucial assumptions as follows:

1. Some suspicion is often well-founded in competitive organizations; as in the course of unforeseeable political circumstances, the cost of misplaced trust can have a disastrous effect,
2. In a potentially uncertain, dangerous and risky environment people need to know very well who can be trusted and under what circumstances. Moreover, it is essential to see the necessity of being aware of potential dangers.

The essence of trust management is not only to trust but to decide to what extent to trust-- and how to create and develop trusting relationships.

When there is a trust deficit a climate of resignation ensues. It brings on consternation and makes it hard to concentrate on agreed targets. People tend naturally to limit these effects and create "trust substitutes to counteract the climate of uncertainty generated by these effects". These equivalents of trust are as follows:

1. Providentialism – meaning supernatural forces, fortune, God or metaphysical forces.
2. Corruption – predicting and having control under the other’s people's actions using bribes, favors, favoritism and so on.
3. Pressure – directly and unconditionally controlling the other’s people's actions.
4. Isolation (ghettoization) – separating certain ethnical, religion or professional groups in unfavorable and threatening its environment, with strong internal loyalty strengthened by Xenophobia and lack of tolerance for the others.
5. Paternalism – considered as going in search of strong authority, leader – „quasi father” – who assures missing order, hierarchical harmony and predictability of the group’s life.
6. Externalization – meaning transferring trust in other external groups or communities together with a tendency to idealize the procedure of operations, organizational solutions or total quality of an institution of a targeted group.
7. Excessive assistance of legal institutions – when businessmen do not trust each other, they need formal means to secure the transaction (for instance, detailed contracts, bank guarantees, employing certifying notary, and tendency to sue).

== Application ==
Trust management needs to be put in practice. The strategy that leads to this is trust building. The rules of trust creation refer to rules and guidelines which have a far- reaching influence on the formation and development of trust. Trust building is the kind of the management strategy because it is strongly focused not only on the present, but first of all on the future cooperation.

The level of trust determines not only individual development, but above everything else it fosters the social and economic evolution of the whole communities. Therefore, trust management is the best solution to develop. However, it is possible only when people act in the atmosphere of trust where trust culture in commonly acceptable and required by every member of the society.

== Culture of trust ==
Trust culture stands for disseminated in society rules which oblige every citizen to treat trust and trustworthiness as common shared values. In this culture well-rooted norm is to redeem the obligations, be honest, open to collaborate with others. Trust culture negates the existence of corruption.

Culture of trust is helpful in insecure and unorganized situations. Trust can be recognized as the strategy of dealing with uncertainty. Distrust culture is based on cynicism, disorder, corruption, exploiting others, deceiving, great care. In order to function in distrust culture there are implemented various formal legal remedies.

Trust has focal meaning for the success of every transaction. It stimulates the human activities. In countries with trust culture there is higher social well-being and economic growth. In distrust culture those who trust in others are believed to be naive and simple-minded and they are the victims of unfair transactions. Cynicism limits the collaboration, the freedom of activity, destroys communication and divides people. Trust is depreciated.

== Building trust ==
Building trust has special meaning for social capital. According to Putnam trust is one of elements constituting social capital, together with norms and networks. Without this capital there is impossible the economical and social growth and building capitalism and democracy. Citizens need to have the feeling that they influence state affairs and live in the country characterized by culture of trust. Fukuyama, American politician, economist and political philosopher brought forward the issue of trust and social capital in his famous book entitled Trust: The Social Virtues and the Creation of Prosperity.
