= Felix Oberholzer-Gee =

Swiss academic

Felix Oberholzer-Gee is a Swiss academic. He is the Andreas Andresen Professor of Business Administration in the Strategy Unit at Harvard Business School. A member of the faculty since 2003, Professor Oberholzer-Gee received his master's degree, summa cum laude, and his Ph.D. in Economics from the University of Zurich.

== File sharing ==
Oberholzer-Gee and Koleman Strumpf wrote The effect of file sharing on record sales: An empirical analysis, which was published in 2007; and in 2008 was cited during the Pirate Bay trial.

Their analysis indicated that file-sharing of music had negligible impact on CD sales, though this has been disputed by the recording industry and other researchers. However these critiques were never peer reviewed (unlike the original paper) and the authors have received significant funding from the record industry.
