= Tomás Rivera Policy Institute =

Latino think tank based at the University of Southern California

The Tomás Rivera Policy Institute (TRPI) is a Latino think tank based at the USC Price School of Public Policy. It is named after scholar Tomas Rivera. It was founded in 1985 at Pitzer College and moved to USC in 2003.

TRPI focuses its research and policy advocacy activities into four main areas:

1. economic well-being
2. educational issues faced by Latinos
3. information technology
4. political and civic engagement.

There is a satellite office at Columbia University. Harry Pachon was the former director of the institute. In 2005, the institute had over 30 million print citations and 80,000 website visitors. The institute relaunched in Fall 2011 under the leadership of a new director, Roberto Suro.

== See also ==
- NCLR
