= Africa–United States relations =

- AU: United States

Africa

United States

Africa–United States relations are the political, economic and cultural ties between the United States and the independent African countries.

== History ==
Before World War II, the United States dealt directly only with the former American colony of Liberia, the independent nation of Ethiopia, the self-governing dominion of the British Empire of South Africa and the semi-independent nation of Egypt.

=== South Africa ===
The United States and South Africa have currently maintained bilateral relations since 1994 after the end of Apartheid, with Nelson Mandela as the first black president and head of state, with the new flag first flown on 27 April 1994, following the landslide victory of South African general election, which declares 27 April as the first South African public holiday as Freedom Day. The ANC represents the first democratic election take place to coincide with its first post-apartheid elections that was recognized by President Bill Clinton on 10 May 1994. Originally intended to be an interim flag, the new design blended the black-green-yellow tricolour of the African National Congress with the red-white-blue colour scheme found on the flags of the United Kingdom and the Netherlands. The six colours were arranged around a Y shape, representing a convergence on a new harmonious future which has led the opinions of the past since the British settlers who came to South Africa and the Afrikaners with Dutch settlement along with those opinions of the majority Black population between the tribes of Xhosa and the Zulu peoples along with the former German colony that once settled by the Germans and the mandate of South African administration of Namibia since independence in 1990, which shares the border between the two countries since the end of Apartheid regime.

=== Angola ===
The enslaved people of Angola were captured by the Dutch and Portuguese traders which transported to tens of thousands of African slaves especially the descent of Mestiço that became a vast majority of Luso-Africans that lived in Portuguese Africa were taken from the port city of São Paulo da Assunção de Loanda to the colony of New Amsterdam by the Dutch West India Company, later renaming the city of New York which became part of the British America. With the slave ships docked in Manhattan were many enslaved people were bought and sold in auctions by the colonists, while the other slaves were brought to work on sugar and coffee plantations in the area surrounding Cap-Français (now Cap-Haïtien), which was a major port and center of the French Caribbean colony of Saint-Domingue (later known as Haiti). The city of Rio de Janeiro once founded by Estácio de Sá became an important colony for the Portuguese after it was discovered by the navigator Pedro Álvares Cabral as the primary port for the forced migration of enslaved Africans to Brazil with a direct route for the transatlantic slave trade was established between the Portuguese colony of Rio de Janeiro and Luanda. Rio de Janeiro is home to the largest Portuguese population outside of Lisbon and for the settlers from Angola. The Seven Years' War as well as the French and Indian War had led so many campaigns in the Caribbean and in New France which led the French defeat more devastating. Following the American Revolution which led the surrender of Yorktown and the Evacuation of New York, some colonists of the newly independent young United States wanted to join the British which left New York City for British-controlled Canada as the United Empire Loyalists which then became part of British North America. The French Revolution had begun with the Storming of the Bastille, which was later followed by the September Massacres, the establishment of the French Republic, the Execution of Louis XVI and Robespierre's Reign of Terror. In Saint Domingue, the black leaders such as Toussaint Louverture, Jean-Jacques Dessalines and Henri Christophe had defeated the French army of Napoleon Bonaparte during the Haitian Revolution with Napoleon selling Louisiana, once part of Spain and France to the United States as part of Louisiana Purchase by Thomas Jefferson during his presidency. Following the betrayal and death of Toussaint Louverture at Fort de Joux in France, Dessalines had finally defeated the French army led by Rochambeau at the Battle of Vertières with a famous victory for the black soldiers once they became slaves by defeating the white settlers of Saint Domingue and finally declared independence from French rule and rename the island of Ayiti (Land of High Mountains). Haiti became the world's first and oldest black-led republic, the first country to abolish slavery, the first Latin America and Caribbean state and the first in the Greater Antilles as a whole and also the second oldest independent nation in the Americas after the United States. As the Portuguese Colonial War had compared to Angolan War of Independence led to the overthrow of Estado Novo during the Carnation Revolution, the new Angolan politician and poet Agostinho Neto had declared Angola independence from Portugal on 11 November 1975 after 400 years of Portuguese colonial rule. Brazil was the first country to recognize Angola's independence from Portuguese rule. The Angolan Civil War went on until 4 April 2002 when the war came to conclude with a victory for the Movimento Popular de Libertação de Angola – Partido do Trabalho for more than 26 years. In East Flatbush, located in Brooklyn, New York, has a notable Angolan community, and is known as a hub for the African American community, with parts of the neighborhood known as Little Haiti with 91.4% Black or African-American and 51% foreign-born, with the majority of foreign-born residents being from both Africa and Haiti.

=== Democratic Republic of the Congo ===
The Belgian Congo proclaimed its independence from Belgium on 30 June 1960, the actual transfer of sovereignty from Belgium to the Congolese people involved a handover ceremony where King Baudouin of Belgium declared it, as President Eisenhower recognized the Democratic Republic of the Congo's independence from Belgian rule as a new nation in Africa. While the United States and Belgium were concerned about Lumumba's policies, particularly his close relationship with the Soviet Union and his perceived communist sympathies. Joseph-Desiré Mobutu came to power and renamed the country Zaire until its overthrow in 1997 by the First Congo War, which was a nationalist move supported by the United States, following the Congo Crisis that ended in 1965. Mobutu's rule was characterized by widespread corruption, human rights abuses, and economic hardship by the repressive totalitarian government of which Mobutu had created as the Mouvement Populaire de la Révolution (MPR), and was responsible for utilizing various methods to maintain power and silence opposition, including the establishment of a security apparatus to monitor and control the population, by reinforcing fear and intimidation that characterized Mobutu's regime. Mobutu's forces were unable to effectively counter the ADFL's advance, leading to the collapse of his regime and the Republic of Zaire itself that led the capture of Kinshasa. He was forced to flee the capital in May 1997 that effectively ending Mobutu's long rule, while the rebel leader Laurent Kabila had changed the country's name back to the Democratic Republic of the Congo, as Mobutu had fled into exile in Morocco, where he later died in the same year. With the DRC marked by significant violence and conflict, with the legacy of both Belgian colonial rule and Mobutu's totalitarian regime. The Second Congo War manifested in various forms, including atrocities, genocide, starvation, and widespread violence which forced many Congolese individuals to evacuate and fled their country as refugees to the United States and Belgium due to the ongoing violence, instability, and human rights abuses, causing widespread displacement of millions more.

=== Ghana ===
Kwame Nkrumah, the founder of Ghana came to the United States in 1942 and spent his summer there Harlem in New York, a center of black life, thought and culture which titled as the Black Capital or the Capital of Black America. He also went to Britain which came to London from the British West African colony of the Gold Coast, following the end of the Second World War in Europe which marked as VE Day in May 1945. Nkrumah ensured that his native Africa became developed and free from British colonial rule which it did until 1957 as Ghana which became the first subsaharan country in Africa as a whole to gain independence.

=== Nigeria ===
Nigeria gained its independence from Britain on 1 October 1960 and it was recognized by the United States. Nigeria's long history dates back to the 15th century where it was discovered by the Portuguese navigators in 1472, the slaves were brought to the American colonies from their homeland of West Africa, which has earned Nigeria as a Slave Coast. They finally landed in New York through decades until the American Revolution defeated the British which led the Evacuation Day from New York for Canada which became part of the United Empire Loyalist along with the British, their settlers and with their slaves. Sir Frederick Lugard (Lord Lugard) unified both northern and southern protectorate into Colony and Protectorate of Nigeria. The British and then the French invaded the German colony of Kamerun during World War I. Following the end of World War II in 1945, it became the Federation of Nigeria before finally becoming independent from British control as did in the same way as the American Revolutionary War. Nigerian English is the same language and the same dialect as the American and British English which unites both Black British and African Americans into one family of Mother Africa. Following the independence from British rule, Nigeria's film industry became a masterpiece which has modelled as Nollywood after the American film studio as Hollywood along with the United Kingdom as part of the British source material. Nigeria enjoys both friendship with the United States and the United Kingdom as part of a Special Relationship.

=== Liberia ===
U.S. relations with Liberia date back to 1819, when the Congress appropriated $100,000 for the establishment of Liberia. The settlers were free blacks or freed slaves who were selected and funded by the American Colonization Society (ACS). The religious ethos and cultural norms of the ACS shaped Afro-American settler society and determined social behavior in 19th-century Liberia. The Methodist Episcopal Church sent black ministers as missionaries to Liberia. Although they could identify with the local population on a purely racial basis, the nature of their religious indoctrination caused them to view the Liberians as inferiors whose souls needed saving.

Under Republican President Abraham Lincoln, The United States officially recognized Liberia in 1862, 15 years after its establishment as a sovereign nation, and the two nations shared very close diplomatic, economic, and military ties until the 1990s.

The United States had a long history of intervening in Liberia's internal affairs, occasionally sending naval vessels to help the Americo-Liberians, who comprised the ruling minority, put down insurrections by indigenous tribes (in 1821, 1843, 1876, 1910, and 1915). By 1909, Liberia faced serious external threats to its sovereignty from the European colonial powers over unpaid foreign loans and annexation of its borderlands.

President William Howard Taft devoted a portion of his First Annual Message to Congress (December 7, 1909) to the Liberian question, noting the close historical ties between the two countries that gave an opening for a wider intervention:

"It will be remembered that the interest of the United States in the Republic of Liberia springs from the historical fact of the foundation of the Republic by the colonization of American citizens of the African race. In an early treaty with Liberia there is a provision under which the United States may be called upon for advice or assistance. Pursuant to this provision and in the spirit of the moral relationship of the United States to Liberia, that Republic last year asked this Government to lend assistance in the solution of certain of their national problems, and hence the Commission was sent across the ocean on two cruisers.

In 1912, the U.S. arranged a 40-year international loan of $1.7 million, against which Liberia had to agree to four Western powers (America, Britain, France, and Germany) controlling Liberian government revenues for the next 14 years, until 1926. American administration of the border police also stabilized the frontier with Sierra Leone and checked French ambitions to annex more Liberian territory. The American navy also established a coaling station in Liberia, cementing its presence. When World War I started, Liberia declared war on Germany and expelled its resident German merchants, who constituted the country's largest investors and trading partners – Liberia suffered economically as a result.

In the largest American private investment in Africa, in 1926, the Liberian government gave a concession to the American rubber company Firestone to start the world's largest rubber plantation at Harbel, Liberia. At the same time, Firestone arranged a $5 million private loan to Liberia.

In the 1930s, Liberia was again virtually bankrupt, and, after some American pressure, agreed to an assistance plan from the League of Nations. As part of this plan, two key officials of the League were placed in positions to "advise" the Liberian government.

=== Ethiopia ===
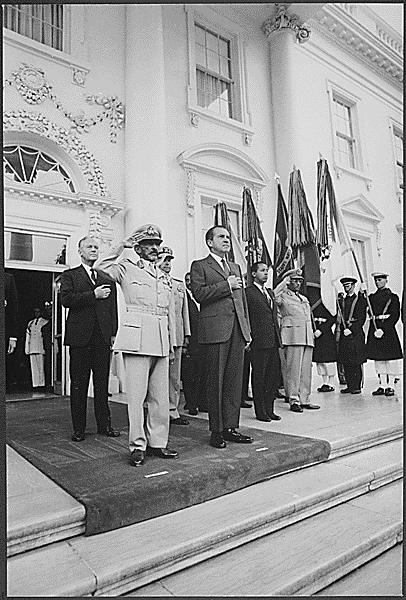
Emperor Haile Selassie and President Nixon in 1969.

U.S.-Ethiopian relations were established in 1903, after meetings in Ethiopia between Emperor Menelik II and an emissary of President Theodore Roosevelt. This first step was augmented with treaties of arbitration and conciliation signed at Addis Ababa 26 January 1929. These formal relations included a grant of Most Favored Nation status, and were good up to the Italian occupation in 1935.

Italy invaded and conquered Ethiopia 1935, and evaded League of Nations sanctions. The United States was one of only five countries which refused to recognize the Italian conquest. During World War II, British forces expel the Italians and restored independence to Ethiopia. In January 1944, when President Franklin Roosevelt met personally with Emperor Haile Selassie in Egypt. The meeting both strengthened the Emperor's already strong predilection towards the United States, as well as discomforted the British who had been at odds with the Ethiopian government over the disposition of Eritrea and the Ogaden.

In the 1950s, Ethiopia became a minor player in the Cold War after signing a series of treaties with the United States, and receiving $282 million in military assistance and $366 million in economic assistance in agriculture, education, public health, and transportation. In 1957, Vice President Richard Nixon visited Ethiopia and called it "one of the United States' most stalwart and consistent allies".

The economic aid came through Washington's "Point Four" program and served as a model for American assistance to the newly independent African nations. The original goal of "Point Four" was containing the spread of communism, which was not a major threat in Africa in the 1950s. More broadly it served as a political project to convince Africans that it was to their long-term interest to side with the West. The program sought to improve social and economic conditions without interfering with existing political or social order.

=== Kenya ===
Kenya was recognized by the United States after its independence from the United Kingdom on 12 December 1963. Kenya and the United States have long been close allies and have enjoyed cordial relations. Barack Obama Sr., the father of Barack Obama, the former President of the United States, was born in Rachuonyo District, British Kenya in 1934. He was a senator and governmental economist who begot to the bloodlines of the Obama Family. Kenyan Americans migrated from the former British colony to the United States to become American citizens.

=== Morocco ===
Relations between Morocco and the United States date back to the 18th century. On December 20, 1777, the Kingdom of Morocco became the first country in the world to recognize the independence of the United States of America, only a year and a half after the U.S. Declaration of Independence was issued.

=== Senegal ===
The island of Gorée was one of the first places in Africa to be settled by the French, after it was discovered by the Portuguese in 1444 before it was ceded to the Dutch in 1558, then to England in 1664 and finally to France in 1677. Senegal was a catalyst for the slave trade, and from the Homann Heirs map figure shown, shows a starting point for migration and a firm port of trade. Slaves of the transatlantic slave trade were shipped from their homeland of West Africa to the British colonies of America as they landed in the harbor of New York, where they stood in auctions and were sold to various settlers. After exploration and trade along the West African coast during the 17th century, the two powers of Britain and France contended for supremacy in the Senegambia region over the following centuries in the Seven Years War, the American Revolution, the French Revolution, and the Napoleonic Wars with the defeat of Napoleon Bonaparte, who was sent to exile and died in Saint Helena in 1821. One of the most important leading figures of the whole of Francophone Africa was Léopold Sédar Senghor, who was the first African to become a member of the French Academy in Paris after he wrote the memoirs of his native country of Senegal under French colonial rule before it finally gained its independence from France on 4 April 1960. Senghor served as its first President of Senegal until 1980, after more than 283 years of French rule, and Saint Louis was the capital of Francophone Africa before the seat of government relocated to Dakar. Dakar became one of the most important cities of the French Empire and the whole of Francophone Africa (Black Africa). Dakar is one of tropical Africa's leading industrial and service centers, which enjoys relations with France and the United States.

=== Egypt ===
Trade and cultural relations date back to the late 19th century. the Presbyterians and other Protestant organizations sponsored large-scale missionary activity. Small numbers of Egyptians converted to Christianity. Influential circles in the United States gained an increased awareness of the social and economic conditions in Egypt. One major impact was bringing modern educational methods to Egypt, which the local officials and British had largely ignored. The flagship institution was the American University in Cairo, which offered all classes in Arabic, and practiced flexible methods that were adopted in Egyptian-sponsored schools when they began to appear in the 20th century.

Official Modern relations were established in 1922 when the United States recognized Egypt's independence from a protectorate status of the United Kingdom. Britain nevertheless controlled Egyptian foreign affairs, and the United States rarely had direct connections with the Egyptian government. In 1956, the U.S. was alarmed at the closer ties between Egypt and the Soviet Union, and prepared the OMEGA Memorandum as a stick to reduce the regional power of President Gamal Abdel Nasser.

When Egypt recognized Communist China, the U.S. ended talks about funding the Aswan Dam, a high-prestige project much desired by Egypt. The dam was later built by the Soviet Union. When Nasser nationalized the Suez Canal in 1956, the Suez Crisis erupted with Britain and France invading to retake control of the canal. Using heavy diplomatic and economic pressure, the Eisenhower administration forced Britain and France to withdraw soon. A major result was that the United States largely replaced Great Britain in terms of regional influence in the Middle East.

=== Others ===
==== Kingdom of Dahomey ====
In 1860, the Clotilda arrived in the Kingdom of Dahomey to illegally transport 110 slaves to the United States after the U.S. abolished the Atlantic slave trade in 1808 with the Act Prohibiting Importation of Slaves, the last known slave ship to have carried slaves from Africa to the United States.

Writing in his journal in 1860, Captain William Foster of the Clotilda described how he came in possession of the enslaved Africans on his ship,

from thence I went to see the King of Dahomey. Having agreeably transacted affairs with the Prince we went to the warehouse where they had in confinement four thousand captives in a state of nudity from which they gave me liberty to select one hundred and twenty-five as mine offering to brand them for me, from which I preemptorily [sic] forbid; commenced taking on cargo of negroes, successfully securing on board one hundred and ten.

==== Togo ====
In 1901, the Tuskegee Institute, a state college in Alabama directed by the national Black leader Booker T. Washington, sent experts to the German colony of Togo in West Africa. The goal was to introduce modern agricultural technology in order to modernize the colony, basing its economy on cotton exports.

=== World War II ===
Vichy France controlled much of North Africa. With the British based in Egypt pushing back German and Italian forces, the United States and Britain launched Operation Torch with amphibious landings in Morocco and Algeria in November 1942. After a brief resistance, the Vichy French forces switched sides and began to collaborate with the Allies. After some delays, the eastern and western Allied forces met up in Tunisia and forced the surrender of the main German and Italian armies. The Americans then moved on to an invasion of Sicily and in southern Italy.

Numerous locations in Africa were used in moving supplies that were either flown in via Brazil or brought in by ship. Supplies were shipped across Africa and moved through Egypt to supply the Soviet Union.

== Contemporary era ==
=== Decolonization, 1951–1961 ===
All the colonial powers engaged in decolonization in the 1950s, starting with Libya 1951, Sudan, Morocco and Tunisia in 1956, and Ghana in 1957. In 1958 President Eisenhower's State Department created the Bureau of African Affairs under the Assistant Secretary of State for African Affairs to deal with sub- Sahara Africa. Countries in North Africa were under the Bureau of Near Eastern Affairs. G. Mennen Williams, a former Democratic governor of Michigan, was the assistant secretary of state under President John F. Kennedy. Williams actively promoted and encouraged decolonization. The Kennedy administration launched the Peace Corps, which sent thousands of young American volunteers to serve in local villages. The United States Agency for International Development (USAID) started providing cash economic assistance, and the Pentagon provided funds and munitions for local armies. Euphoria ended when the Congo Crisis of the 1960s indicated very large scale instability.

Historian James Meriweather argues that American policy towards Africa was characterized by a middle road approach, which supported African independence but also reassured European colonial powers that their holdings could remain intact. Washington wanted the right type of African groups to lead newly independent states, which tended to be noncommunist and not especially democratic. Meriweather argues that nongovernmental organizations influenced American policy towards Africa. They pressured state governments and private institutions to disinvest from African nations not ruled by the majority population. These efforts also helped change American policy towards South Africa, as seen with the passage of the Comprehensive Anti-Apartheid Act of 1986.

=== Kennedy–Johnson administrations, 1961–1969 ===
Whereas Eisenhower had largely neglected Africa, President John F. Kennedy took an aggressive activist approach. Kennedy was alarmed by the implications of Soviet leader Nikita Khrushchev's 1961 speech that proclaimed the USSR's intention to intervene in anticolonial struggles around the world. Since most nations in Europe, Latin America, and Asia had already chosen sides, Kennedy and Krushchev both looked to Africa as the next Cold War battleground. Under the leadership of Sékou Touré, the former French colony of Guinea in West Africa proclaimed its independence in 1958 and immediately sought foreign aid.

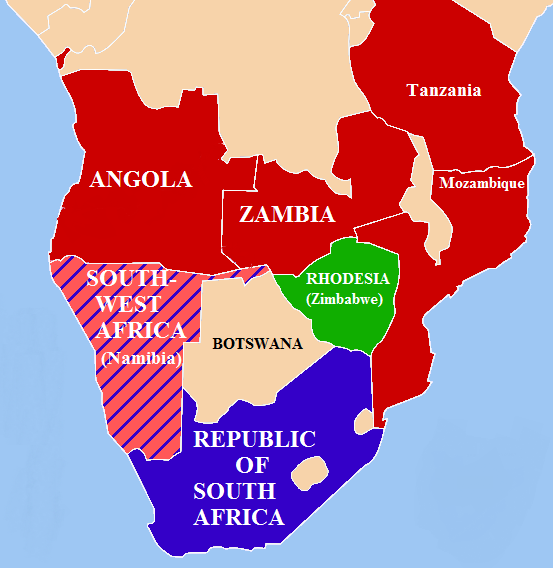
The geopolitical situation in Southern Africa, 1978–1979. SWAPO allies South African allies South West Africa (Namibia) South Africa

Eisenhower was hostile to Touré, so the African nation quickly turned to the Soviet Union--making it the Kremlin's first success story in Africa. Kennedy and his Peace Corps director Sargent Shriver tried even harder than Khrushchev. By 1963 Guinea had shifted away from Moscow into a closer friendship with Washington. Kennedy had a broad vision that encompassed all of Africa. He opened up the White House to receive eleven African heads of state in 1961, ten in 1962, and another seven in 1963.

=== Carter administration, 1977–1981 ===
Historians are generally agreed that President Jimmy Carter, 1977–81, was not very successful when it came to Africa. However, there are multiple explanations available. The orthodox interpretation posits Carter as a dreamy star-eyed idealist. Revisionists said that did not matter nearly as much as the intense rivalry between dovish Secretary of State Cyrus Vance and hawkish National Security Adviser Zbigniew Brzezinski. Vance lost nearly all the battles, and finally resigned in disgust.

Meanwhile, there are now post-revisionist historians who blame his failures on his confused management style and his refusal to make tough decisions. Along post-revisionist lines, Nancy Mitchell in a monumental book depicts Carter as a decisive but ineffective Cold Warrior, who, nevertheless had some successes because Soviet incompetence was even worse.

=== Reagan–Bush administrations, 1981–1993 ===
The Presidency of Ronald Reagan, starting in January 1981, decided that the Carter administration had largely failed in Africa, and sharply changed directions. It abandoned the Carter emphasis on human rights, and instead emphasized anti-communism. This meant reversals of policies in South Africa and Angola, and changes in the USA's relationships with Ethiopia and Libya, which were pro-Soviet.

Carter's policy was to denounce and try to end the apartheid policies in South Africa and Angola, whereby small white minorities had full control of government. Under the new conservative administration a more conciliatory approach was taken by the Assistant Secretary of State Chester Crocker. He rejected confrontational approaches, and called for "Constructive engagement". Crocker was highly critical of the outgoing Carter administration for its apparent hostility to the white minority government in South Africa, by acquiescing in the United Nations Security Council's imposition of a mandatory arms embargo (UNSCR 418/77) and the UN's demand for the end of South Africa's illegal occupation of Namibia (UNSCR 435/78).

Crocker came up with a complex multinational peace plan, that he struggled to achieve for eight years. The most essential provision required the removal of Cuba's large, well-armed forces from Angola. The United States would then quit funding the anti-Marxist forces led by Jonas Savimbi, South Africa would pull out of Southwest Africa, allowing Namibia to become independent. The white rulers in South Africa would remain in power but relax their restrictions on the African National Congress. Crocker was successful in 1988, and during the George HW Bush administration, 1989 to 1993, the goals were realized.

The Reagan administration mobilized private philanthropic and business sources to fund food supplies to areas in Africa devastated by famine. For example, music promoter Bob Geldorf in 1985 produced Live Aid, a benefit concert that raised over $65 million and dramatically raised awareness. US government focused on transportation and administrative issues.

== Military ==
As of 2019 the U.S. military maintains a network of 29 military bases across the African continent.

== Agreement ==
The Trump administration is using economic ties and access to minerals to strengthen America's geopolitical position vis-à-vis China and Russia. The Trump administration has already taken steps toward these changes. Ambassadors in Africa have been repurposed more as negotiators than diplomats and advisors to the Trump administration. They negotiated a peace agreement between the DRC and Rwanda, which should benefit the United States. The United States is gradually advancing its interests in Africa.

== Cultural relations ==
=== Sports ===
The American National Basketball Association also has significant popularity in the continent. The American National Football League has also greatly increased its investment in African athletes.

== Diplomatic missions ==
- The African Union maintains a delegation with a resident Ambassador to Washington, D.C.

== United States's foreign relations with African countries ==
- Algeria–United States relations
- Angola–United States relations
- Benin–United States relations
- Botswana–United States relations
- Burkina Faso–United States relations
- Burundi–United States relations
- Cameroon–United States relations
- Cape Verde–United States relations
- Central African Republic–United States relations
- Chad–United States relations
- Comoros–United States relations
- Democratic Republic of the Congo–United States relations
- Republic of the Congo–United States relations
- Djibouti–United States relations
- Egypt–United States relations
- Equatorial Guinea–United States relations
- Eritrea–United States relations
- Eswatini–United States relations
- Ethiopia–United States relations
- Gabon–United States relations
- (The Gambia) Gambia–United States relations
- Ghana–United States relations
- Guinea–United States relations
- Guinea-Bissau–United States relations
- Ivory Coast–United States relations
- Kenya–United States relations
- Lesotho–United States relations
- Liberia–United States relations
- Libya–United States relations
- Madagascar–United States relations
- Malawi–United States relations
- Mali–United States relations
- Mauritania–United States relations
- Mauritius–United States relations
- Morocco–United States relations
- Mozambique–United States relations
- Namibia–United States relations
- Niger–United States relations
- Nigeria–United States relations
- Rwanda–United States relations
- São Tomé and Príncipe–United States relations
- Senegal–United States relations
- Seychelles–United States relations
- Sierra Leone–United States relations
- Somalia–United States relations
- South Africa–United States relations
- South Sudan–United States relations
- Sudan–United States relations
- Tanzania–United States relations
- Togo–United States relations
- Tunisia–United States relations
- Uganda–United States relations
- United States–Zambia relations
- United States–Zimbabwe relations

== See also ==
- African Growth and Opportunity Act (AGOA)
- African immigration to the United States
- United States Africa Command
- Africa–China relations
- Africa–Soviet Union relations
- Africa–European Union relations
- France–Africa relations
