= Arab–American relations =

Relationship between the Arab World and the United States

Flag of the Arab League

Flag of the United States

Arab–American relations prior to World War II were limited. However, the first country to officially recognize the United States was Morocco. Moreover, in comparison to European powers such as Britain and France which had managed to colonise almost all of the Arab world after defeating the Ottoman Empire in 1918, the United States was ‘popular and respected throughout the region’. Indeed, ‘Americans were seen as good people, untainted by the selfishness and duplicity associated with the Europeans’. American missionaries had brought modern medicine and set up educational institutions all over the Arab World. In addition to this, the US had provided the Arab states with highly skilled petroleum engineers. Thus, there were some connections, which were made between the United States and the Arab states before the Second World War. All in all, the American-Arab relations have had their ups and downs, with each conflict changing the relations. At the moment, Arab–American relations are very strong economically, where the Arab world is the third largest exporter to the US, and the US is the first largest importer in the Arab world. Nevertheless, these strong economic relations fail to show in the political arena.

== Early Relations ==
=== Moroccan-American Relations ===
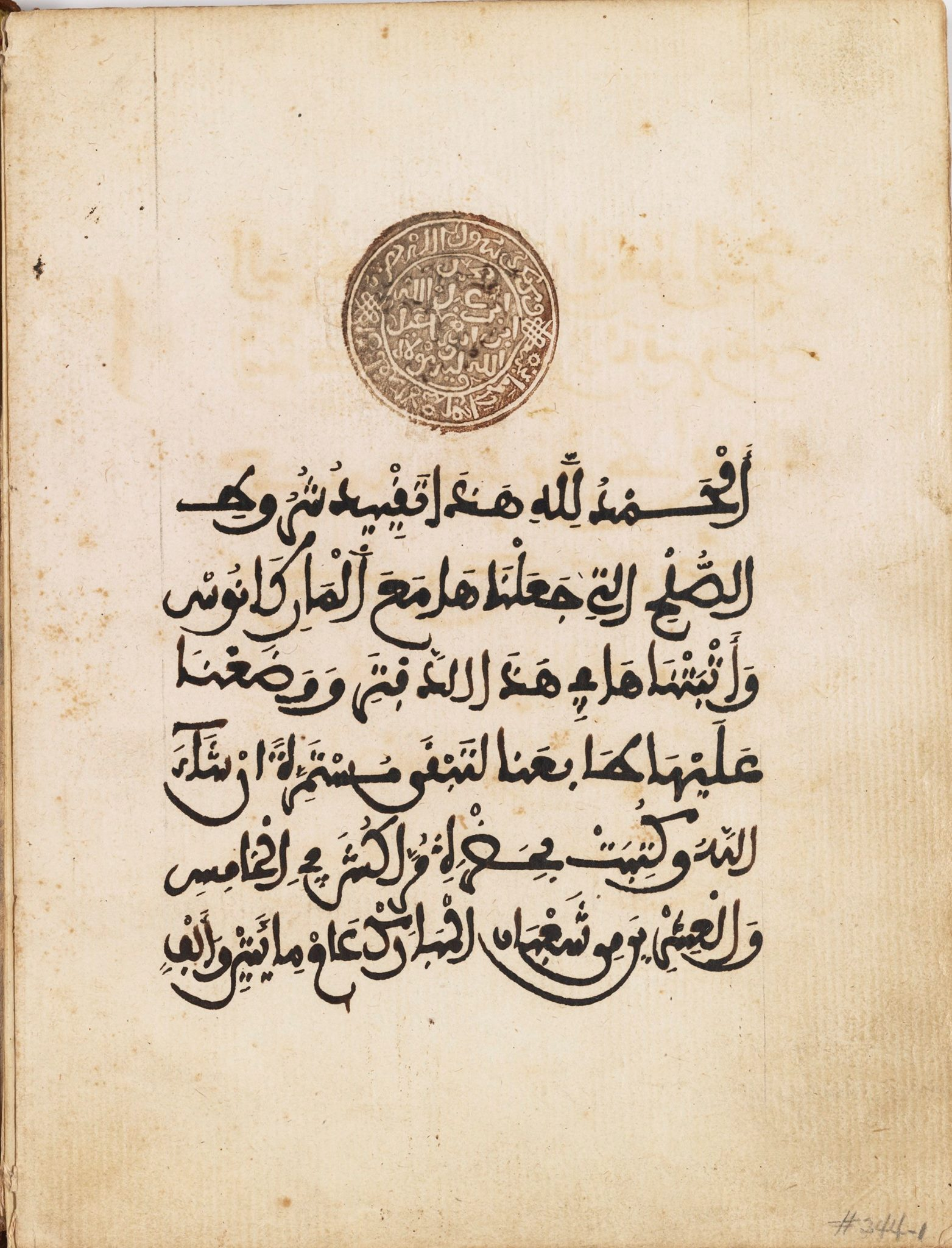
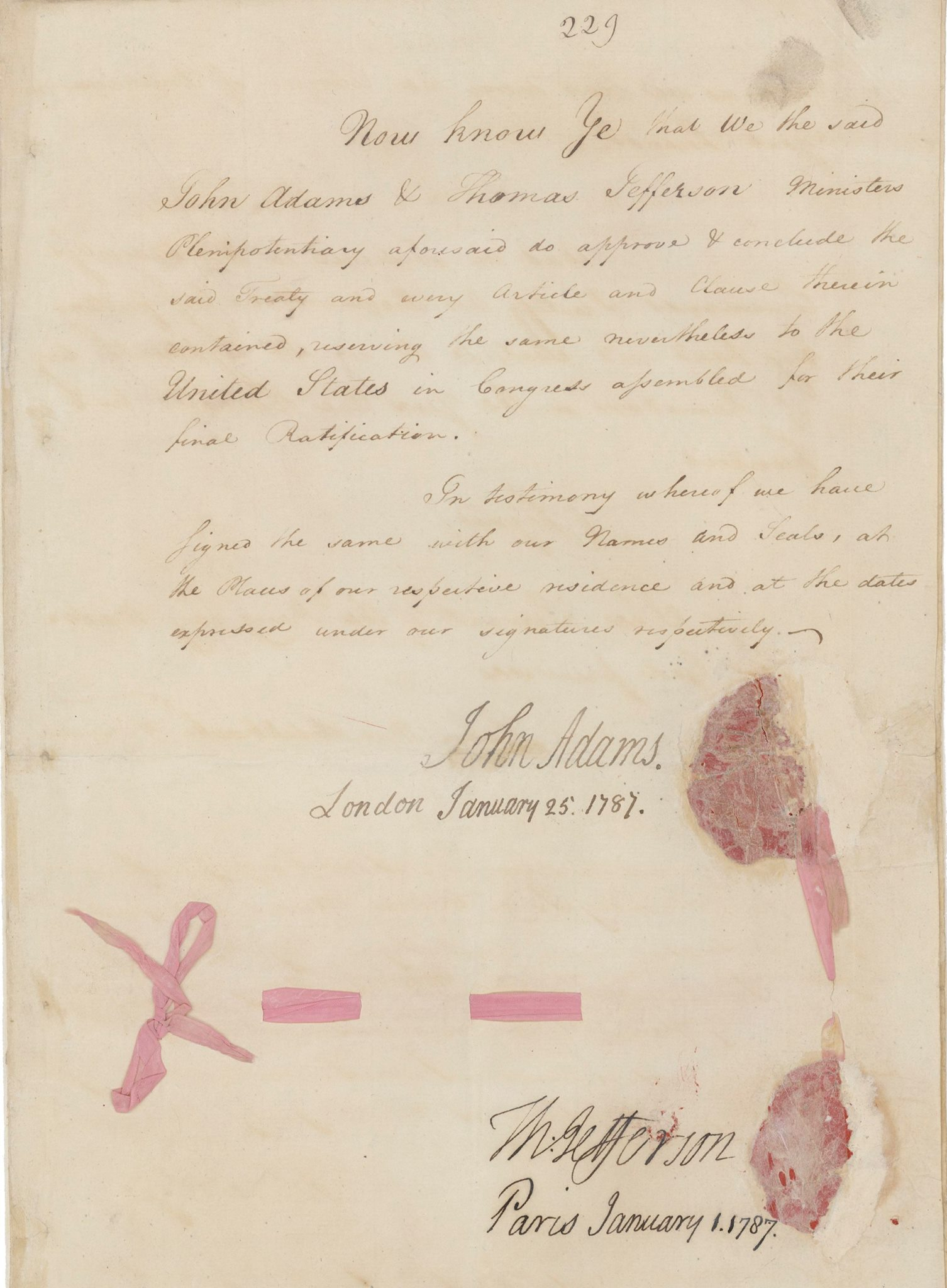
Moroccan-American Treaty of Friendship of 1787.

The historical ties between the Kingdom of Morocco and the United States of America date back to the American Revolutionary War (1775–1783), notably deepening in 1777 when Sultan Mohammed ben Abdallah became the first monarch to offer aid to the United States, hence making Morocco the first major country or kingdom to recognize American Independence.

Formal U.S. diplomatic relations with Morocco began in 1787 when the Confederation Congress ratified a Treaty of Peace and Friendship between the two nations which had been signed earlier in 1786. Renegotiated in 1836, the treaty is still in force, constituting the longest unbroken treaty relationship in U.S. history, and Tangier is home to the oldest U.S. diplomatic property in the world. Now a museum, the Tangier American Legation Museum is also the only building outside of the U.S. that is now a National Historic Landmark. The Treaty was executed in Europe by American envoys John Adams and Thomas Jefferson, later receiving ratification from the Confederation Congress (operating under the earlier Articles of Confederation and Perpetual Union government) in July 1787. As of 2020, the treaty has endured transatlantic pressures and tensions for over 235 years, establishing itself as the longest unbroken treaty alliance in the history of the United States. Morocco continues to stand as one of America's enduring and trusted allies in North Africa.

Among the correspondence exchanged between America and Morocco, one notable instance was a letter from the inaugural President George Washington to Muhammed Ibn Abdullah. Dated December 1, 1789, during the early months of his presidency, Washington addressed issues of authority and leadership in the United States, as well as the communication breakdown between Morocco and America. In the letter, Washington expressed regret for delays in communication, attributing them to governmental transitions and a desire to establish clear terms of engagement. He also commended Muhammed Ibn Abdullah's diplomatic efforts in protecting American ships from pirates, recognizing the vulnerability of the fledgling United States, which lacked naval power at the time. Morocco's willingness to engage in diplomatic negotiations marked a significant milestone, as it became the first Arab, African, or Muslim state to formalize a treaty with America, despite America's inability to safeguard its vessels in the Mediterranean.

=== Oman-American Relations ===
The United States relationship with Oman dates back 200 years, with American merchant ships making port calls in Oman as early as 1790. Oman was the first nation from the Arabian Peninsula to recognize the United States, sending an envoy in 1841. The United States had established trade relations with the Sultanate in the early years of American independence. The first Treaty of Amity and Commerce was concluded at Muscat on 21 September 1833, by Edmund Roberts and Said bin Sultan. The treaty was the first agreement of its kind with an independent Arab state in the Persian Gulf. This initial treaty was replaced by the Treaty of Amity, Economic Relations, and Consular Rights signed at Salalah on 20 December 1958

=== Barbary Wars ===
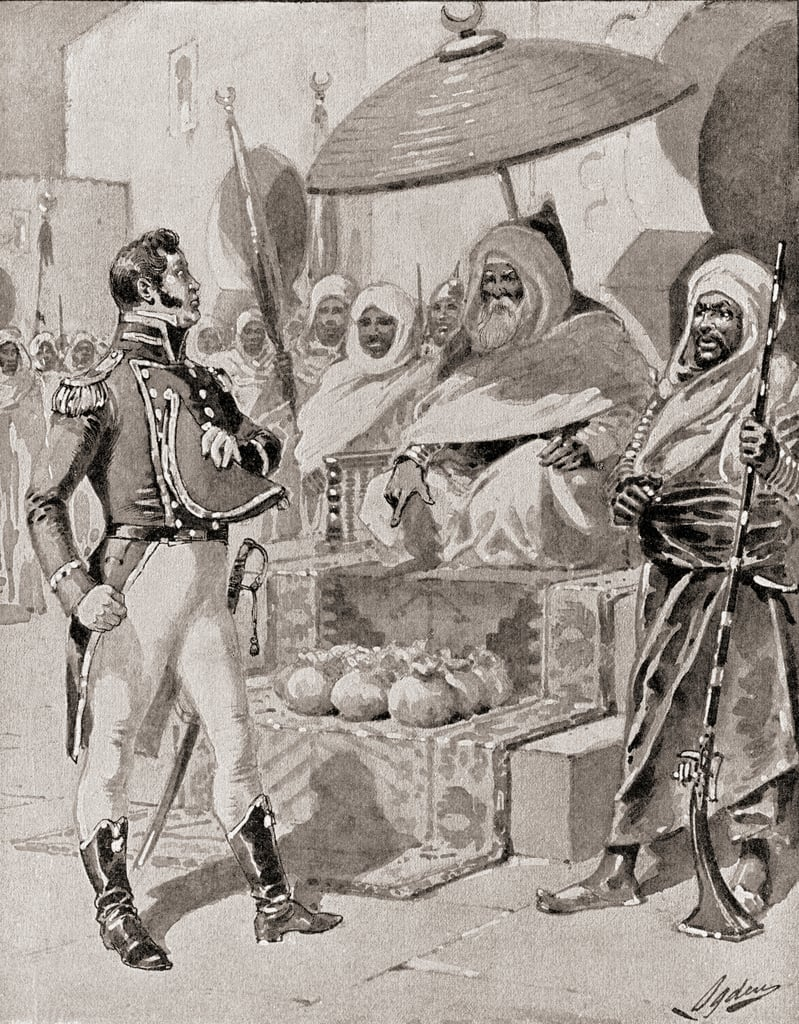
Captain William Bainbridge paying tribute to the Dey of Algiers, 1800

The Barbary Wars were a series of conflicts fought between the United States and the Arab Barbary States of North Africa, namely the Ottoman provinces of Tripolitania, Algiers, and Tunis, as well as the independent Sultanate of Morocco. These wars took place between 1801 and 1815 and were primarily sparked by the Barbary States' practice of piracy and extortion against American merchant ships in the Mediterranean Sea.

During this time, the Barbary States, which included present-day Libya, Algeria, Tunisia, and Morocco, held strategic positions along the North African coast and controlled crucial trade routes. They demanded tribute payments from European nations and the United States in exchange for safe passage for their ships. However, the demands became increasingly exorbitant, and the Barbary rulers resorted to capturing ships and enslaving their crews for ransom.

Faced with mounting losses and the violation of their sovereignty, the United States, under Presidents Thomas Jefferson and James Madison, decided to confront the Barbary States militarily rather than continue paying tribute. This led to the First Barbary War (1801–1805) against Tripoli, followed by the Second Barbary War (1815) against Algiers.

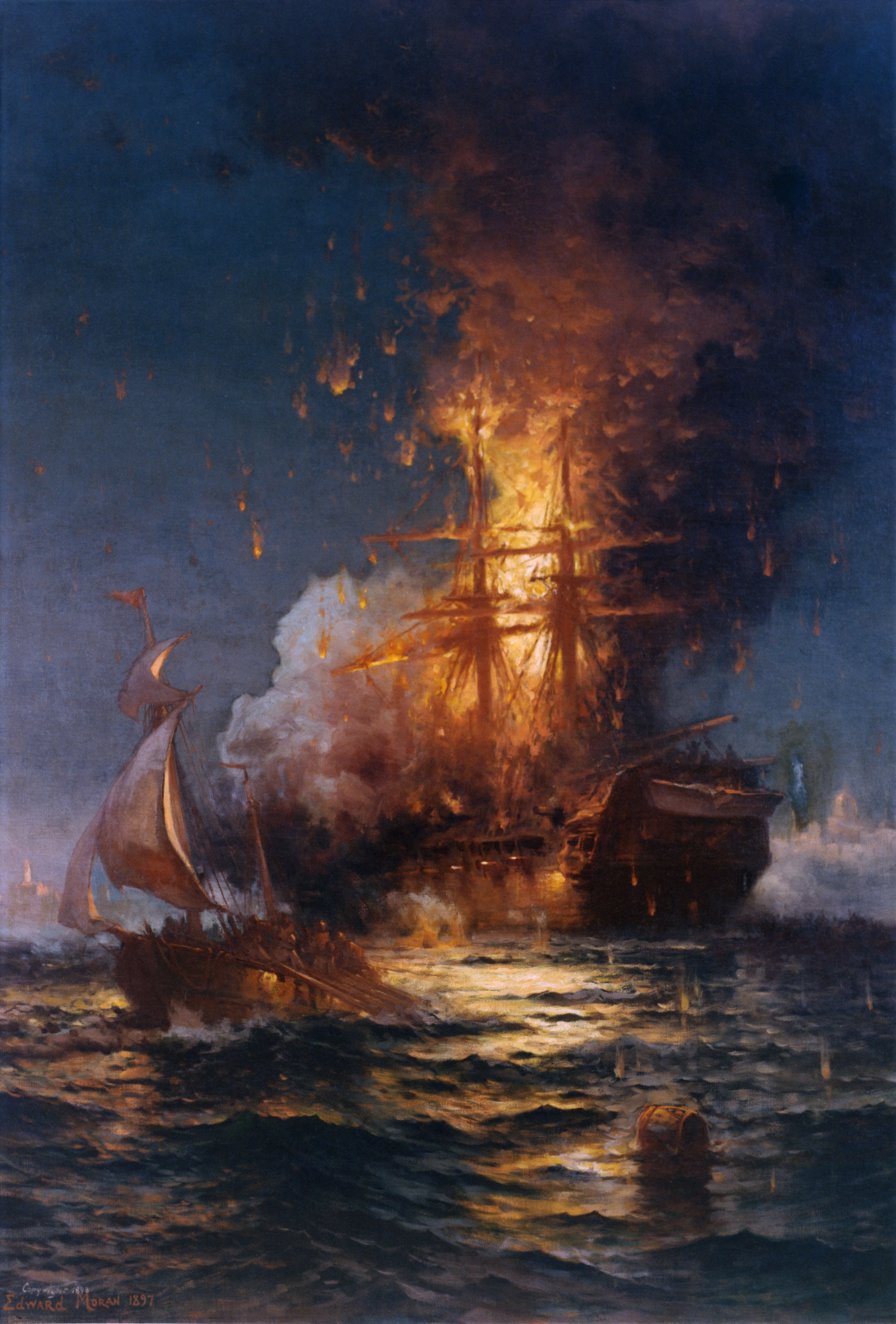
USS Philadelphia burning at the Battle of Tripoli Harbor during the First Barbary War in 1804

The conflict was characterized by naval engagements, most notably the actions of the fledgling United States Navy's small fleet against the larger and more established Barbary corsair fleets. The American navy achieved notable successes, including the famous victories of the USS Enterprise and USS Constitution.

The Barbary Wars marked a significant moment in Arab–American relations. They demonstrated America's determination to protect its interests abroad and its unwillingness to submit to extortion. Additionally, the wars highlighted the complexities of diplomatic relations in the Mediterranean region, as the Barbary States were nominally under Ottoman control but operated independently.

In the aftermath of the Barbary Wars, the United States negotiated treaties with the Barbary States, securing safe passage for American ships in exchange for annual payments. These treaties helped to stabilize the region and allowed for increased American trade in the Mediterranean.

== Post-World War II ==
Arab–American relations prior to World War II were limited. However, the first country to officially recognize the United States was Morocco. Moreover, in comparison to European powers such as Britain and France which had managed to colonise almost all of the Arab world after defeating the Ottoman Empire in 1918, the United States was ‘popular and respected throughout the region’. Indeed, ‘Americans were seen as good people, untainted by the selfishness and duplicity associated with the Europeans’. American missionaries had brought modern medicine and set up educational institutions all over the Arab World. In addition to this, the US had provided the Arab states with highly skilled petroleum engineers. Thus, there were some connections, which were made between the United States and the Arab states before the Second World War. All in all, the American-Arab relations have had their ups and downs, with each conflict changing the relations. At the moment, Arab–American relations are very strong economically, where the Arab world is the third largest exporter to the US, and the US is the first largest importer in the Arab world. Nevertheless, these strong economic relations fail to show in the political arena.

== Arab–Israeli Conflict ==
The first real incident of deterioration between the Arab world and the US was when the US recognized Israel and supported it in the United Nations. Furthermore, "the first state to extend diplomatic recognition to Israel was the United States; the Soviet Union and several Western nations quickly followed suit. No Arab state, however, recognized Israel." The United States denounced the Arab intervention in the former Mandatory Palestine that took place shortly after the Israeli Declaration of Independence in 1948. This issue has decreased the US's reputation and role within the Arab streets, hate towards the US increased, and the US was seen as the 'Friend of the Arabs Enemy,' Israel, thus becoming the Enemy.

== Iran–Iraq War ==
The war between Iran and Iraq was another step in Arab–American relations, where the US supported Iraq in its war against the Islamic Republic of Iran. Among major powers, the United States' policy was to "tilt" toward Iraq by reopening diplomatic channels, lifting restrictions on the export of dual-use technology, overseeing the transfer of third party military hardware, and providing operational intelligence on the battlefield. Despite this, the US was also involved in a covert and illegal arms deal, providing sanctioned Iran with weaponry. This political scandal became known as the Iran–Contra affair.

== Gulf War ==
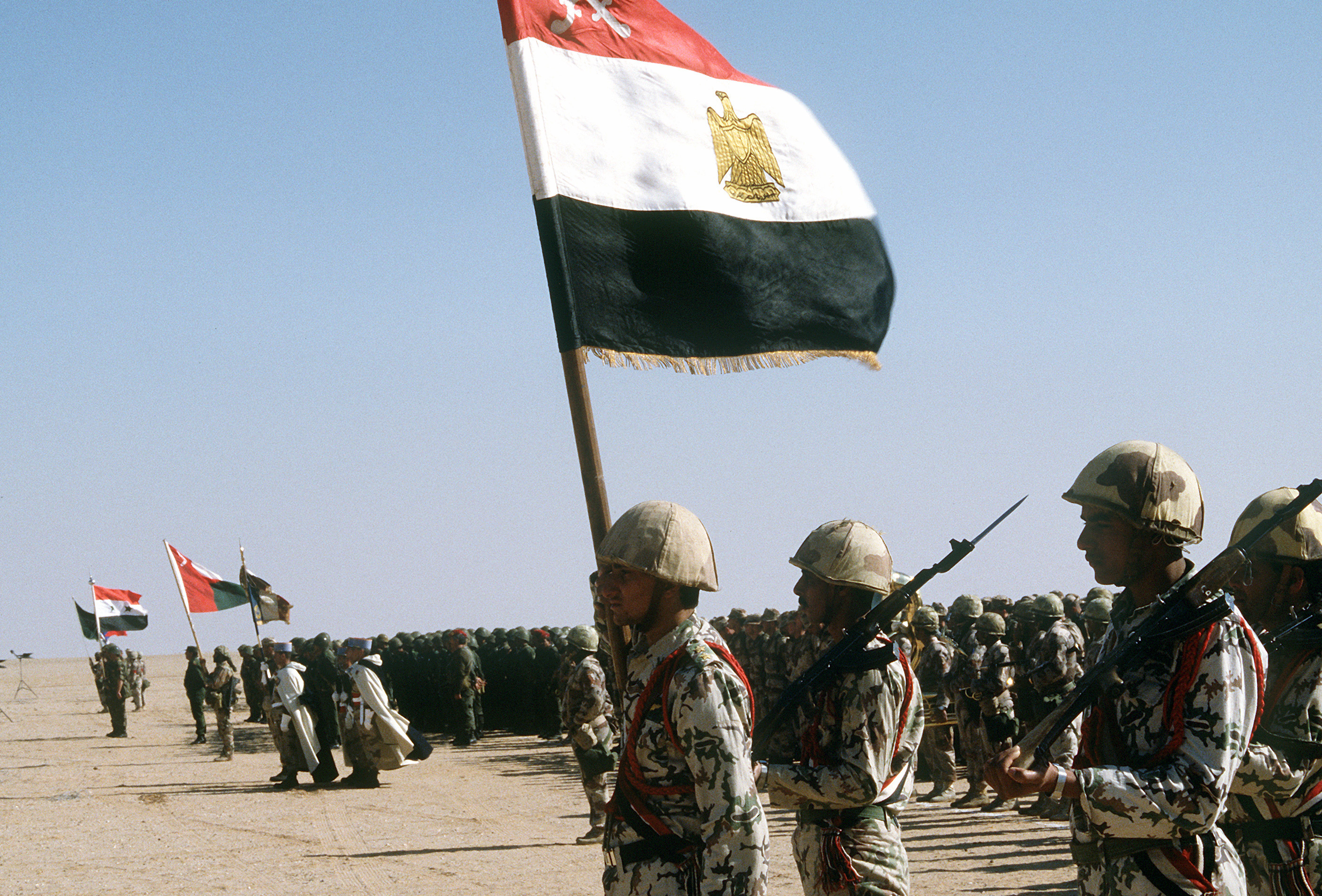
Arab Coalition Forces, from Egypt, Syria, Oman and Kuwait during Operation Desert Storm

The US played a significant role in the Gulf War. When Iraq invaded Kuwait, several other Arab countries decided to enter the war on the side of the US, leader of the anti-Iraqi coalition. This resulted in an image of the US as a liberator, particularly among the wealthy Gulf monarchies of Saudi Arabia, the UAE, Bahrain, Qatar, and Kuwait. The US currently maintains several military bases in the region.

== 11th September ==
In the wake of 9/11, the United States placed an emphasis on counterterrorism. As the prevention of terrorism became the foremost priority, other longstanding policy objectives were reshaped or subordinated. Arab states, particularly those viewed as moderate or strategically positioned, acquired renewed importance in Washington's global calculus. Countries such as Egypt, Jordan, and Saudi Arabia emerged as indispensable partners in intelligence-sharing, regional stability, and diplomatic engagement with the broader Muslim world.

== Iraq War ==
The Arab League unanimously condemned the war, with the exception of Kuwait. Saudi Foreign Minister Prince Saud publicly claimed that the U.S. military would not be authorized to use Saudi Arabia's soil in any way to attack Iraq. However, this was later revealed to have been a front, as Saudi Arabia, Kuwait, and some other Arab states did, in fact, provide support to American troops, but they did not wish to risk offending Saddam pre-war by making those statements publicly. After ten years of U.S. presence in Saudi Arabia, cited among reasons by Saudi-born Osama bin Laden for his September 11, 2001 al-Qaeda attacks on America, most of U.S. forces were withdrawn from Saudi Arabia in 2003. For the duration of the war, the Saudi public remained strongly against the US action, regardless of a UN mandate. Prior to the war, the government repeatedly attempted to find a diplomatic solution, generally agreeing with the US position on Saddam's menace, even going so far as to urge Saddam to go into voluntary exile—a suggestion that angered him a great deal.

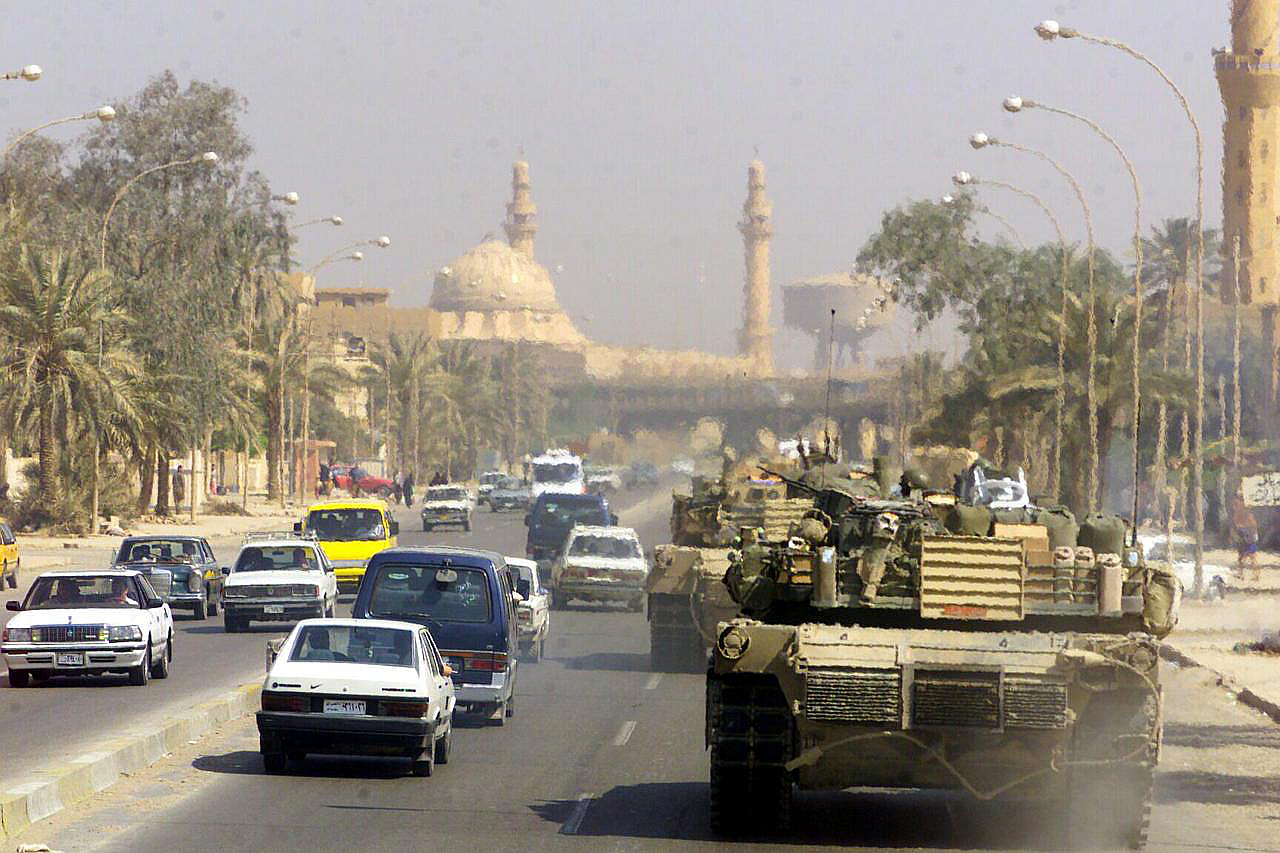
A Marine Corps M1 Abrams tank patrols a Baghdad street after its fall in 2003 during Operation Iraqi Freedom

== Anti-Arabism ==
William A. Dorman, writing in the compedium The United States and the Middle East: A Search for New Perspectives (1992) notes that, in the United States, "anti-Semitism is no longer socially acceptable, at least among the educated classes. No such social sanctions exist for anti-Arabism."

In the mid-1970s, a prominent Russian-born American libertarian author, scholar and philosopher, Ayn Rand, advocated strong anti-Arab sentiment following the Arab-Israeli War of 1973: "The Arabs are one of the least developed cultures. They are typically nomads. Their culture is primitive, and they resent Israel because it's the sole beachhead of modern science and civilization on their continent. When you have civilized men fighting savages, you support the civilized men, no matter who they are."

During the 1991 Gulf War, anti-Arab sentiments increased in the United States. Arab Americans have experienced a backlash as result of terrorist attacks, including events where Arabs were not involved, like the Oklahoma City bombing, and the explosion of TWA Flight 800. According to a report prepared by the Arab American Institute, three days after the Oklahoma City bombing "more than 200 serious hate crimes were committed against Arab Americans and American Muslims. The same was true in the days following September 11."

According to a 2001 poll of Arab Americans conducted by the Arab American Institute, 32% of Arab Americans reported having been subjected to some form of ethnic-based discrimination during their lifetimes, while 20% reported having experienced an instance of ethnic-based discrimination since September 11. Of special concern, for example, is the fact that 45% of students and 37% of Arab Americans of the Muslim faith report being targeted by discrimination since September 11.

According to the FBI and Arab groups, the number of attacks against Arabs, Muslims, and others mistaken as such rose considerably after the 9/11 attacks. Hate crimes against people of Middle Eastern origin or descent increased from 354 attacks in 2000, to 1,501 attacks in 2001. Among the victims of the backlash was a Middle Eastern man in Houston, Texas who was shot and wounded after an assailant accused him of "blowing up the country" and four immigrants shot and killed by a man named Larme Price who confessed to killing them as "revenge" for the September 11 attacks.

== Anti-Americanism ==
For the most part, it is the rise of alternatives, ushered in by modernization, that threatens traditional societies and generates anti-American reaction. The stability of traditional society (like that of modern totalitarian systems) rests on the lack of alternatives, on the lack of choice. Choice is deeply subversive-culturally, politically, psychologically.

The recent outburst of murderous anti-Americanism has added a new dimension to the phenomenon, or at any rate, throws into relief the intense hatred it may encapsulate. The violence of September 11 shows that when anti-Americanism is nurtured by the kind of indignation and resentment that in [turn] is stimulated and sanctioned by religious convictions, it can become spectacularly destructive."

In 2002 and in mid-2004 Zogby International polled the favorable/unfavorable ratings of the U.S. in Saudi Arabia, Egypt, Jordan, Lebanon, Morocco and the United Arab Emirates. In Zogby's 2002 survey, 76% of Egyptians had a negative attitude toward the United States, compared with 98% in 2004. In Morocco, 61% viewed the country unfavorably in 2002, but in two years following the U.S invasion of Iraq, that number has jumped to 88 percent. In Saudi Arabia, such responses rose from 87% in 2002 to 94% in June. Attitudes were virtually unchanged in Lebanon but improved slightly in the UAE, from 87% who said in 2002 that they disliked the United States to 73% in 2004. However most of these countries mainly objected to foreign policies that they considered unfair. According to the 2023 Arab Youth Survey conducted by Dubai-based public relations firm ASDA'A BCW, the United States ranked seventh among countries considered friendly, compared with China, which took second place.

== United States's foreign relations with Arab League countries ==
- Algeria–United States relations
- Bahrain–United States relations
- Comoros–United States relations
- Djibouti–United States relations
- Egypt–United States relations
- Iraq–United States relations
- Jordan–United States relations
- Kuwait–United States relations
- Lebanon–United States relations
- Libya–United States relations
- Mauritania–United States relations
- Morocco–United States relations
- Oman–United States relations
- Palestine–United States relations
- Qatar–United States relations
- Saudi Arabia–United States relations
- Somalia–United States relations
- Sudan–United States relations
- Syria–United States relations
- Tunisia–United States relations
- United Arab Emirates–United States relations
- United States–Yemen relations

== See also ==
- Arab–Iranian conflict
- Arab lobby in the United States
- Arab American Institute
