= Egypt–United States relations =

- Egypt: United States

Diplomatic mission
- Embassy of Egypt, Washington, D.C.: Embassy of the United States, Cairo

Egypt and the United States formally began relations in 1922 after Egypt gained nominal independence from the United Kingdom. Relations between both countries have largely been dictated by regional issues in the Middle East such as the Israeli–Palestinian conflict and Counterterrorism. But also domestic issues in Egypt regarding the country's human rights record and American support for the regimes of Hosni Mubarak and Abdel Fattah el-Sisi for which the United States had come under controversy for in the aftermath of the 2011 Egyptian Revolution, and with many dissidents of the current regime describing Sisi's rule as tyrannical.

== History ==
=== Background ===
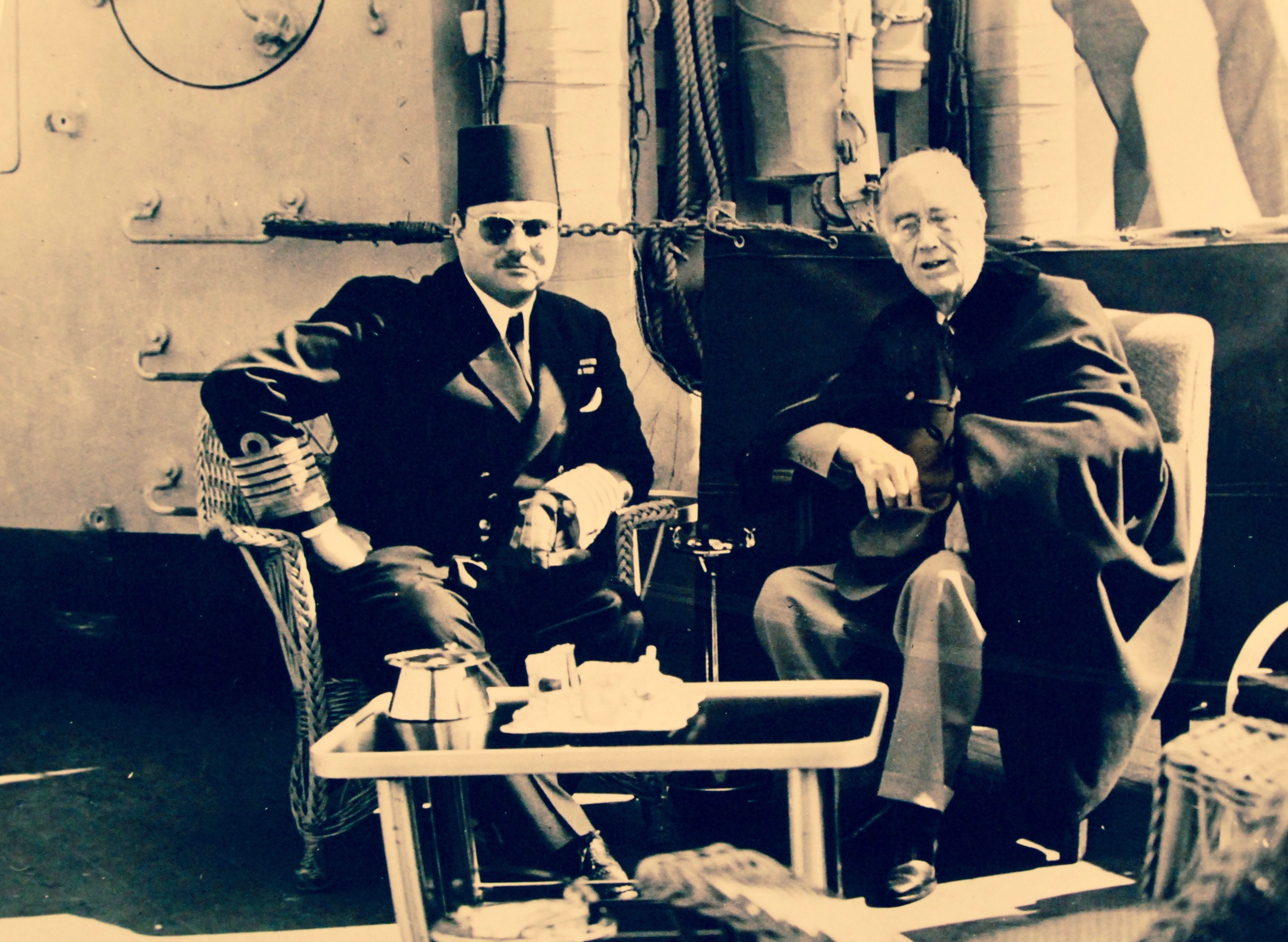
King Farouk I of Egypt (left) meets U.S. President Franklin D. Roosevelt (right) aboard the USS Quincy, anchored in the Great Bitter Lake, north of the Suez Canal, February 1945

The United States had minimal dealings with Egypt when it was controlled by the Ottoman Empire (before 1864) and Britain (1882–1922). President Ulysses S. Grant visited Egypt during his world tour. Egyptian President Gamal Abdel Nasser (1956–1970) antagonized the US by his pro-Soviet policies and anti-Israeli rhetoric, but the Americans helped keep him in power by forcing Britain and France to end their invasion in 1956 immediately. The Americans' policy has been to provide strong support to governments that supported US and Israeli interests in the region, especially Egyptian Presidents Anwar Sadat (1970–1981) and Hosni Mubarak (1981–2011).

Between 1948 and 2011, the US provided Egypt with a cumulative total of $71.6 billion in bilateral military and economic aid. That is the largest amount given to any nation in the same period after Israel.

=== 1950s and 1960s ===
United Arab Republic–United States relations
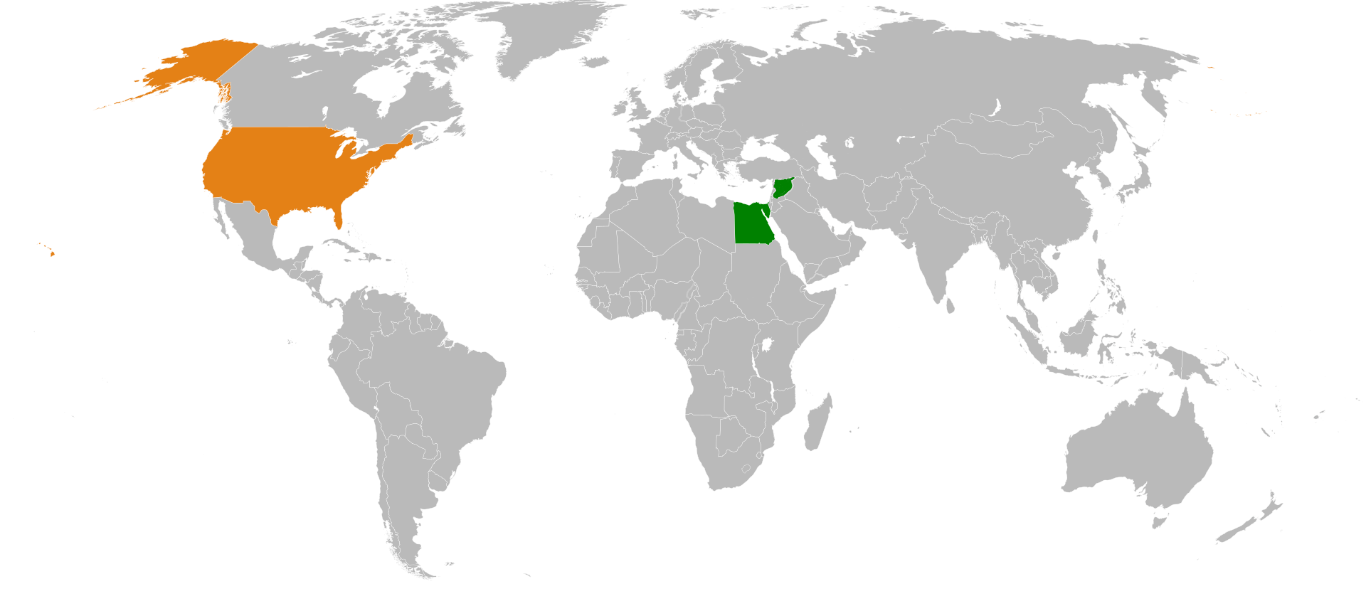

- United Arab Republic: United States

Initially, the Egyptian Revolution of 1952 did not alter relations with the United States, which continued to send foreign aid, with some claiming that the Nasser regime was initially backed by the United States modeled in the Project FF of the CIA.

The Eisenhower administration saw the Near East as a huge gap into which Soviet influence could be projected, and accordingly required an American-supported security system. The region was perceived as strategically important due to its oil, but the United States lacked sufficient troops to resist a Soviet invasion of the Middle East alone. As a consequence, American diplomats favoured the creation of a NATO-type organisation (the Middle East Defense Organization, or MEDO) in the Near East and centred on Egypt to provide the necessary military power to deter the Soviets from invading.

American policy was torn between a desire to maintain good relations with NATO allies such as Britain and France who were major colonial powers, and to align Third World nationalists, who resented British and French influence, with the Free World camp. From 1953 onwards, American diplomacy had attempted unsuccessfully to persuade the powers involved in the Near East, local and imperial, to unite against the Soviets. After his visit to the Middle East in May 1953 to drum up support for MEDO, the Secretary of State, John Foster Dulles found to his astonishment that the Arab states were "more fearful of Zionism than of the Communists".

In May 1953, during a meeting with Secretary Dulles, who asked Egypt to join an anti-Soviet alliance, Nasser responded by saying that the Soviet Union has

never occupied our territory ... but the British have been here for seventy years. How can I go to my people and tell them I am disregarding a killer with a pistol sixty miles from me at the Suez Canal to worry about somebody who is holding a knife a thousand miles away?

Nasser did not share Dulles's fear of the Soviet Union and insisted vehemently he wanted to see the end of British influence in the Middle East. The CIA offered Nasser a $3 million bribe if he would join the proposed Middle East Defense Organization; Nasser took the money, but refused to join. Nasser wanted an Egyptian-dominated Arab League to be the principal defence organisation in the Near East, which might be informally associated with the United States.

Dulles told Eisenhower in a report of May 1953 that the Arab states believed that the United States would back Israel in aggressive expansion, and that the prestige of Western democracy in the Middle East was very low. The immediate consequence was a proposed new policy of "even-handedness" where the United States very publicly sided with the Arab states in disputes with Israel in 1953–54. Moreover, Dulles did not share any sentimental regard for the Anglo-American "special relationship", which led the Americans to lean towards the Egyptian side in the Anglo-Egyptian disputes. During the negotiations over the British evacuation of the Suez Canal base in 1954–55, the Americans supported Egypt, though trying hard to limit the extent of the damage this might cause to Anglo-American relations.

Most of all, Nasser wanted the United States to supply arms on a generous scale to Egypt. Nasser refused to promise that any US arms he might buy would not be used against Israel, and rejected out of hand the American demand for a Military Assistance Advisory Group to be sent to Egypt as part of the arms sales. His frequent anti-Zionist speeches and sponsorship of the Palestinian fedayeen rendered it difficult for the Eisenhower administration to get the approval of Congress necessary to sell weapons to Egypt.

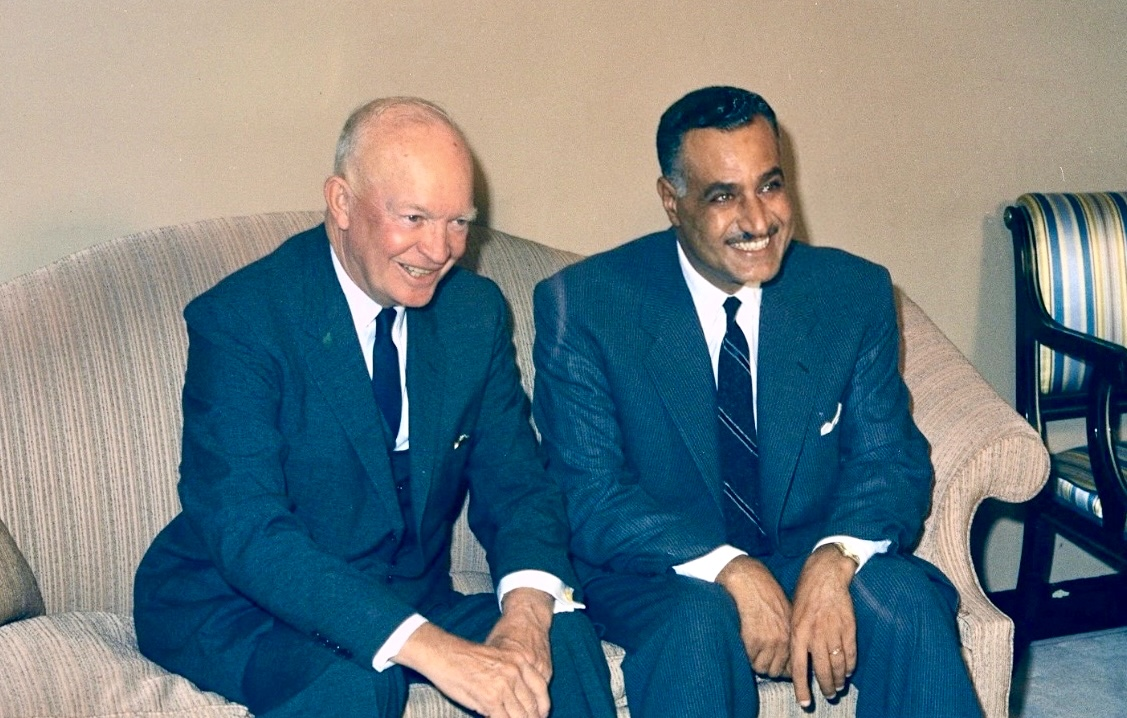
Egyptian President Gamal Abdel Nasser meeting with U.S. president Dwight Eisenhower during Nasser's visit to United Nations in New York, September 1960

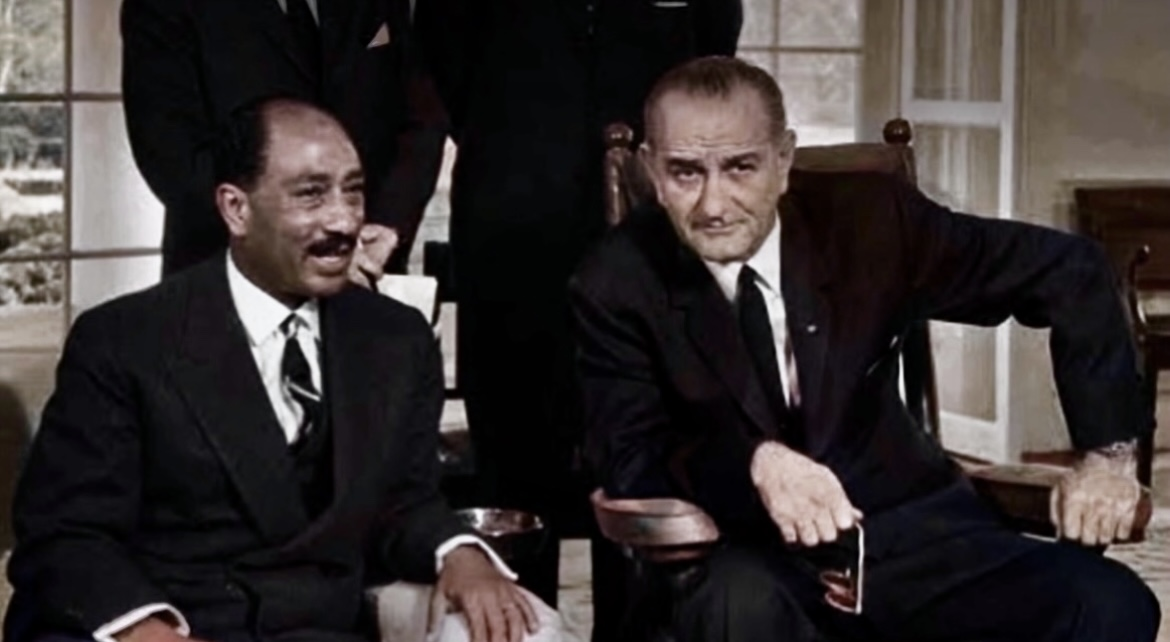
Egyptian Parliament Speaker Anwar Sadat and U.S. President Lyndon Johnson in the White House, 1966

By 1956, the US was alarmed at the closer ties between Egypt and the Soviet Union and prepared the OMEGA Memorandum as a stick to reduce the regional power of President Gamal Abdel Nasser. When Egypt recognized Communist China, the US ended talks about funding the Aswan Dam, a high-prestige project desired by Egypt. The dam was later built by the Soviet Union. When Nasser nationalized the Suez Canal in 1956, the Suez Crisis erupted with Britain and France threatening war to retake control of the canal and depose Nasser. US Secretary of State John Foster Dulles proposed creating an international consortium to run the canal, a solution that Nasser rejected.

At the same time, the United States grew unwilling to support a foreign intervention against Egypt for fear of Soviet intervention. It also was opposed to European colonialism and worried that Western intervention in Egypt would weaken its authority to condemn the Soviet invasion of Hungary. Israel invaded the Suez in October 1956, and Britain and France, in league with Israel, sent in troops to seize the canal. Using heavy diplomatic and economic pressure, the Eisenhower administration soon forced Britain and France to withdraw. The US delegation to the United Nations voted in favor of Security Council resolutions condemning the invasion and creating the United Nations Emergency Force. More significantly, the US threatened to sell its bonds and deny emergency International Monetary Fund assistance for oil shortages, which would cause a devaluation of the pound sterling that would have left Britain unable to import crucial goods. That American pressure led to a temporary warming of Egyptian relations with the United States, but President Dwight D. Eisenhower warned that the US would consider closure of the Straits of Tiran to Israeli shipping as an act of war.

Relations became strained again in the 1960s because Egypt purchased Soviet arms and refused to accept a US-brokered arms control agreement for the Arab-Israeli conflict, which led to the US selling M48A4 Mag'ach tanks and Douglas A-4 Skyhawk attack aircraft to Israel in 1965. The arms sale escalated tensions further, with Egypt expelling the Emergency Force and closing the Straits of Tiran. After US President Lyndon B. Johnson had failed to gain diplomatic support for an international naval operation to reopen the straits by force, he reluctantly decided to support a unilateral preemptive invasion by Israel. The Six-Day War ended with the Israel Defense Forces occupying most of the Palestinian territories, including the Gaza Strip and the Sinai Peninsula, which Egypt had occupied. The United States tried to negotiate a ceasefire to prevent a Soviet intervention and endorsed United Nations Security Council Resolution 242, which encouraged Israel to return its occupied territories in exchange for peace agreements. However, Egypt accused the US of supporting Israel during the war. On June 8, 1967, Egypt severed diplomatic relations with the US and expelled Americans in Egypt. During and after the war, Egypt aligned with the Soviets, who airlifted arms and ammunition to rebuild the Egyptian Armed Forces and sent thousands of advisors to train the Egyptian Army and manage its air defense. Egypt, along with the Soviet Union and Israel, rejected the Rogers Plan, by Johnson's successor, Richard Nixon, to resolve to the Arab-Israeli conflict but accepted a lighter agreement to end the War of Attrition.

=== 1973–2011 ===
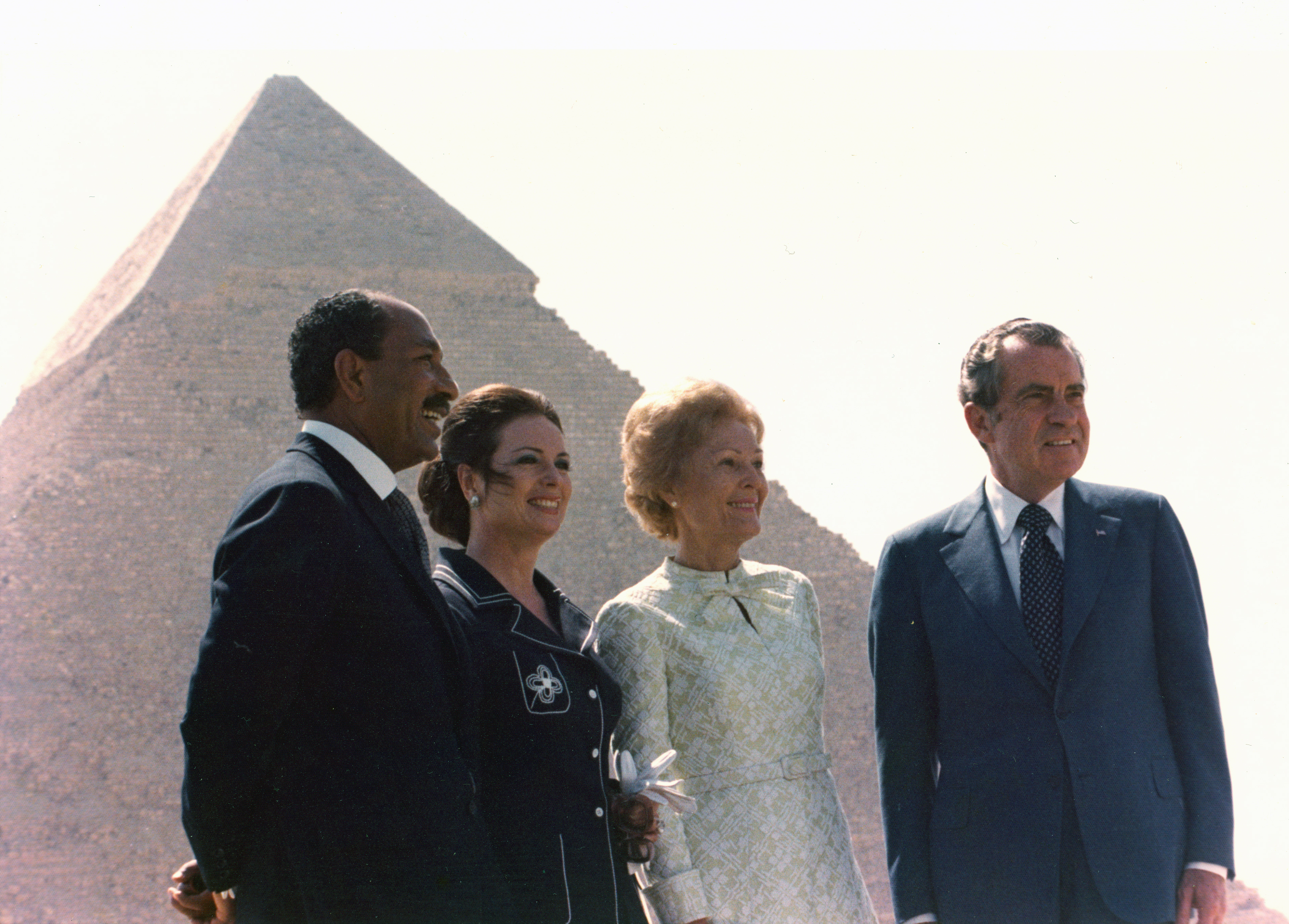
Egyptian President Anwar Sadat and Jehan Sadat with U.S. President Richard Nixon and Pat Nixon at the Giza Necropolis Pyramids, the Great Pyramid of Khufu is Visible in the Background, June 1974

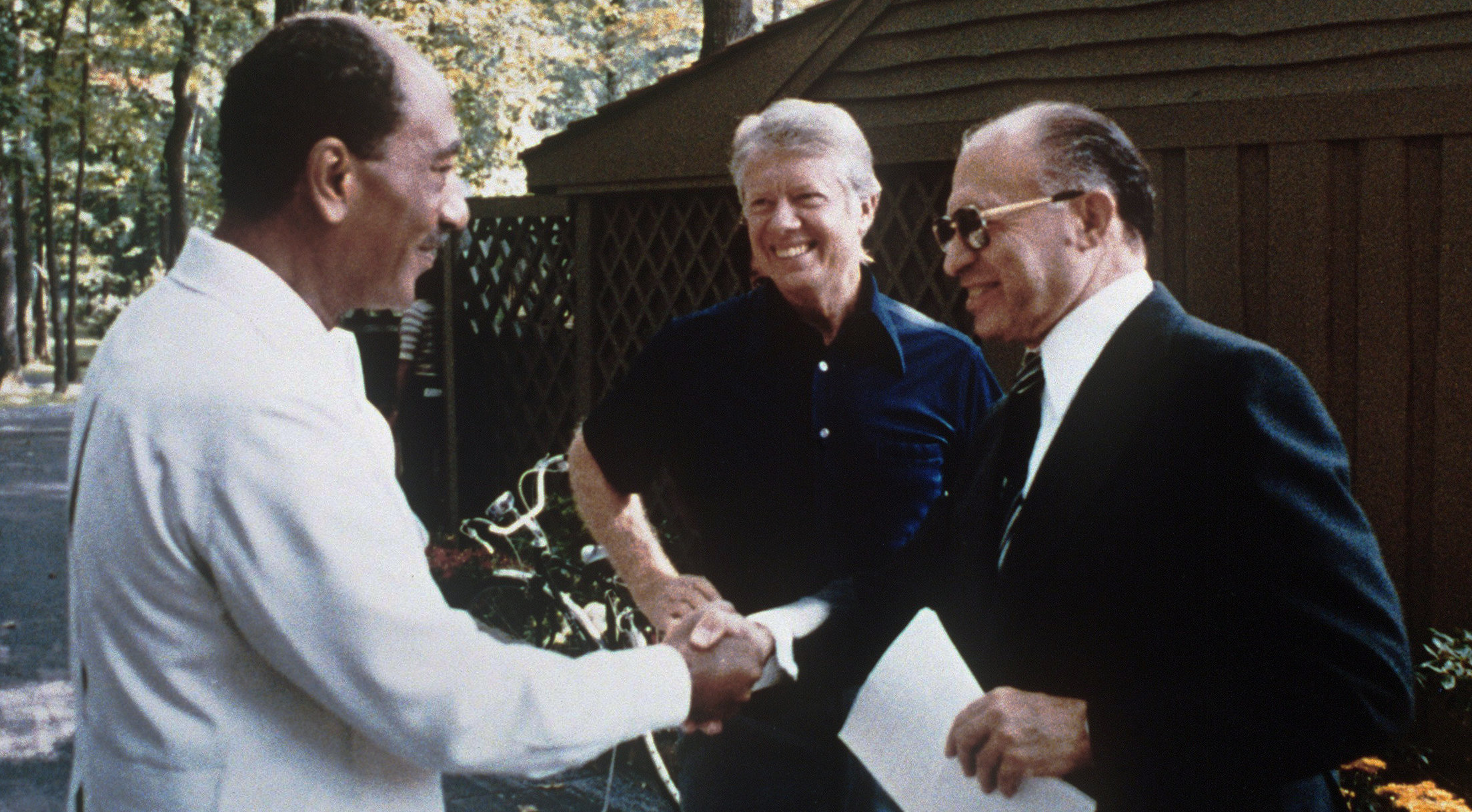
Menachem Begin, Jimmy Carter and Anwar Sadat at Camp David, 1978.

At the beginning of the 1970s American-Egypt relations remained poor because of the presence of anti-aircraft batteries near the Suez Canal. After the death of Nasser, his more moderate successor, Anwar Sadat, opened backchannel negotiations with the Nixon administration for a peace agreement with Israel, but they stalled because of Israel's unwillingness to withdraw the IDF from the eastern bank of the Suez Canal. Confident that Egypt would not try to invade Israel, Nixon and National Security Advisor Henry Kissinger delayed negotiations until after the 1972 United States presidential election and the 1973 Israeli legislative election. Instead, Egypt and Syria launched a surprise invasion of Israel starting the 1973 Yom Kippur War, and Egypt rejected a joint American-Soviet ceasefire proposal. During the war, the United States agreed to an airlift to resupply Israel and accepted Soviet ceasefire proposals at the Security Council, but Kissinger encouraged Israeli forces to continue to advance into Egypt after the tide of the war had shifted. The United States finally convinced Israel to accept a ceasefire because of the OPEC oil embargo and Soviet General Secretary Leonid Brezhnev's threat of direct intervention by the Soviet Armed Forces.

After the war, Egyptian foreign policy began to shift as a result of the change in Egypt's leadership from the fiery Nasser to the much more moderate Anwar Sadat (October 1970) and of the emerging peace process between Egypt and Israel. Sadat realized that reaching a settlement of the Arab–Israeli conflict was a precondition for Egyptian development. To achieve that goal, Sadat ventured to enhance relations with the US to foster a peace process with Israel. After a seven-year hiatus, both countries re-established normal diplomatic relations on February 28, 1974. At the same time, the United States engaged in "shuttle diplomacy" to negotiate disengagement agreements between the Arab world and Israel. Israel and Egypt signed the American-brokered Sinai Interim Agreement in 1975.

Sadat asked Moscow for help, and Washington responded by offering more favorable financial aid and technology for the Egyptian Army. The advantages for the US included Egypt's expulsion of 20,000 Soviet advisors and the reopening of the Suez Canal which were seen by Nixon as "an investment in peace." Encouraged by Washington, Sadat opened negotiations with Israel that resulted most notably in the Camp David Accords, which were brokered by US President Jimmy Carter, and peace with Israel in a historic peace treaty in 1979. Sadat's domestic policy, Infitah, was aimed at modernizing the economy and removing Nasser's heavy-handed controls. Sadat realized that American aid was essential to that goal since it allowed him to disengage from the Israeli conflict and pursue a regional peace policy.

=== 2011 Egyptian Revolution and aftermath ===
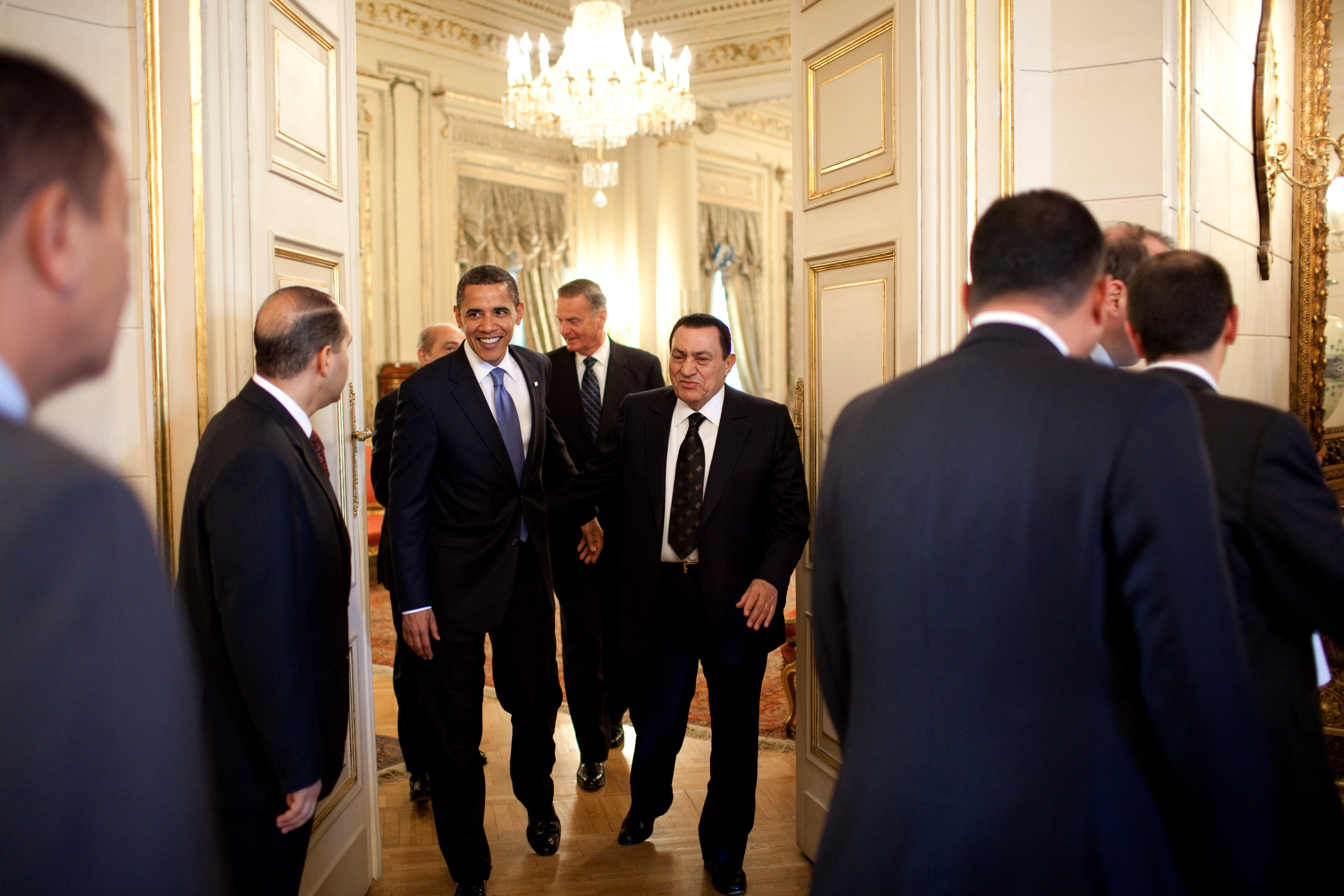
Egyptian President Hosni Mubarak with US President Barack Obama in Cairo, Egypt, 4 June 2009.

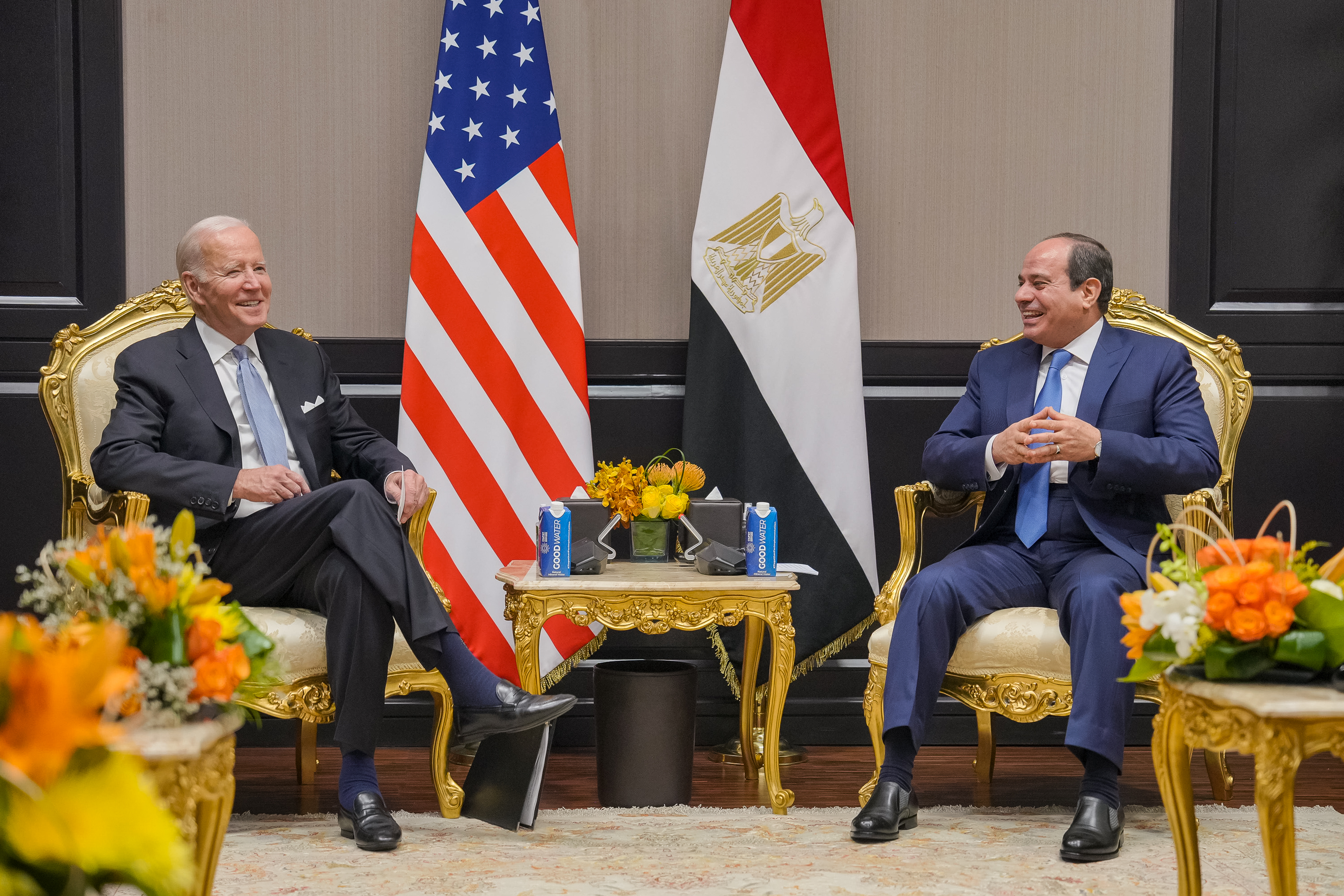
President Joe Biden and Abdel Fattah el-Sisi in Sharm El Sheikh, Egypt, 2022

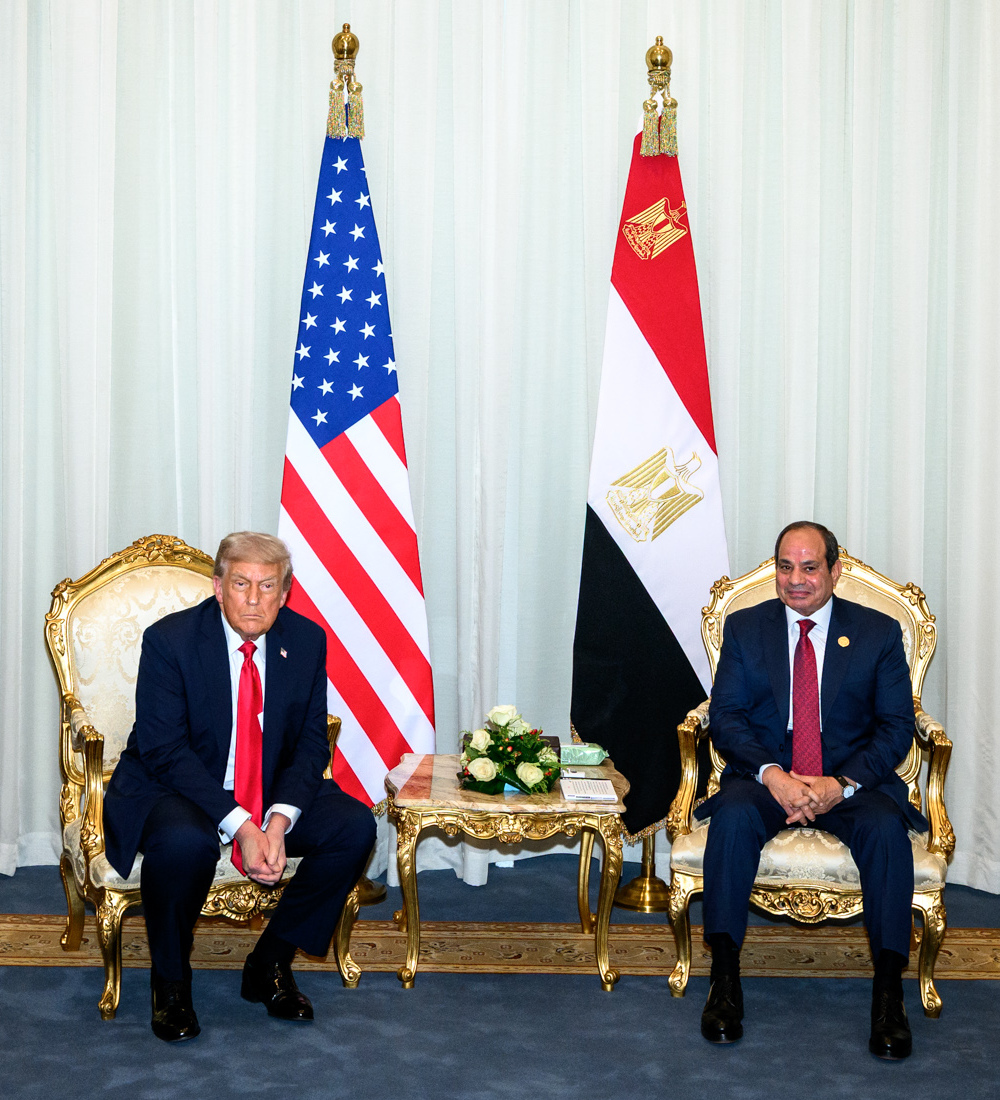
US President Donald Trump meeting Egypt's President Abdel Fattah El-Sisi on sidelines of Sharm El-Sheikh Peace Summit, Sharm El Sheikh, Egypt, 13 October 2025

During the 2011 Egyptian Revolution, top US government officials urged Egyptian President Hosni Mubarak and his government to reform, refrain from using violence, and respect the rights of protesters such as those to peaceful assembly and association. Ties between the countries became strained after Egyptian soldiers and police had raided 17 offices of local and foreign NGOs, including the International Republican Institute (IRI), the National Democratic Institute (NDI), Freedom House, and the German Konrad Adenauer Foundation on December 29, 2011, because of allegations of illegal funding from abroad. The US condemned the raids as an attack on democratic values and threatened to stop the $1.3 billion in its military aid and about $250 million in economic aid that it gave Egypt every year, but the threat was dismissed by the Egyptian government. There were 43 NGO members including Sam LaHood, son of US Transportation Secretary Ray LaHood, and Nancy Okail, then resident director of the American-based NGO Freedom House's operations in Egypt, was charged with obtaining international funds illegally and failing to register with the Egyptian government. After an appeal by those charged, the case had been switched from a criminal court to one handling misdemeanors for which the maximum penalty was a fine, not imprisonment. After lifting a travel ban on 17 foreign NGO members, including 9 Americans, the US and Egypt began to repair their relations.

Nevertheless, on September 11, 2012, (the 11th anniversary of the September 11 attacks) Egyptian protesters stormed the US embassy in Cairo, tore down the American flag, and replaced it with a flag with Islamic symbols to mock the Americans after an anti-Islamic movie denigrating the Islamic prophet, Muhammad, was shot in the United States and released on the internet. Morsi refused to condemn the attack, instead calling on the United States to apologize for allowing the film to be posted. In November 2012, Barack Obama, for the first time since Egypt signed its peace treaty with Israel, declared that the United States does not consider Egypt's Islamist-led government as either an ally or an enemy. In another incident, General Martin Dempsey said that the American–Egyptian military ties would depend on Egypt's actions towards Israel. He said in June 2012, "The Egyptian leaders will salute a civilian president for the first time... and then they'll go back to barracks. But I don't think it's going to be as clean as that. That's why we want to stay engaged with them... not [to] shape or influence, but simply be there as a partner to help them understand their new responsibilities."

Ties between the countries temporarily soured during the overthrow of Egyptian President Mohamed Morsi on July 3, 2013, after a massive uprising against him. The Obama administration denounced Egyptian attempts to combat the Muslim Brotherhood and its supporters, canceled future military exercises, and halted the delivery of F-16 jet fighters and AH-64 Apache attack helicopters to the Egyptian Armed Forces. Popular sentiment among secular Egyptians towards the United States has been negatively affected by conspiracy theories claiming that the Americans had assisted the unpopular Muslim Brotherhood in attaining power and by the Obama administration's policy of tolerance toward the Muslim Brotherhood and Morsi. However, in a 2014 news story, the BBC reported that "the US has revealed it has released $575 million (£338m) in military aid to Egypt that had been frozen since the ousting of President Mohammed Morsi last year." Despite Donald Trump's travel ban to neighboring and other Muslim-majority countries, relations between Egypt and the United States were expected to be warm.

Since 1987, Egypt has been receiving military aid at an average of $1.3 billion a year.

In April 2019, US Secretary of State Mike Pompeo warned Egypt against purchasing Russian Sukhoi Su-35: "We’ve made clear that if those systems were to be purchased, the CAATSA statute would require sanctions on the [al-Sisi's] regime."

== Military cooperation ==
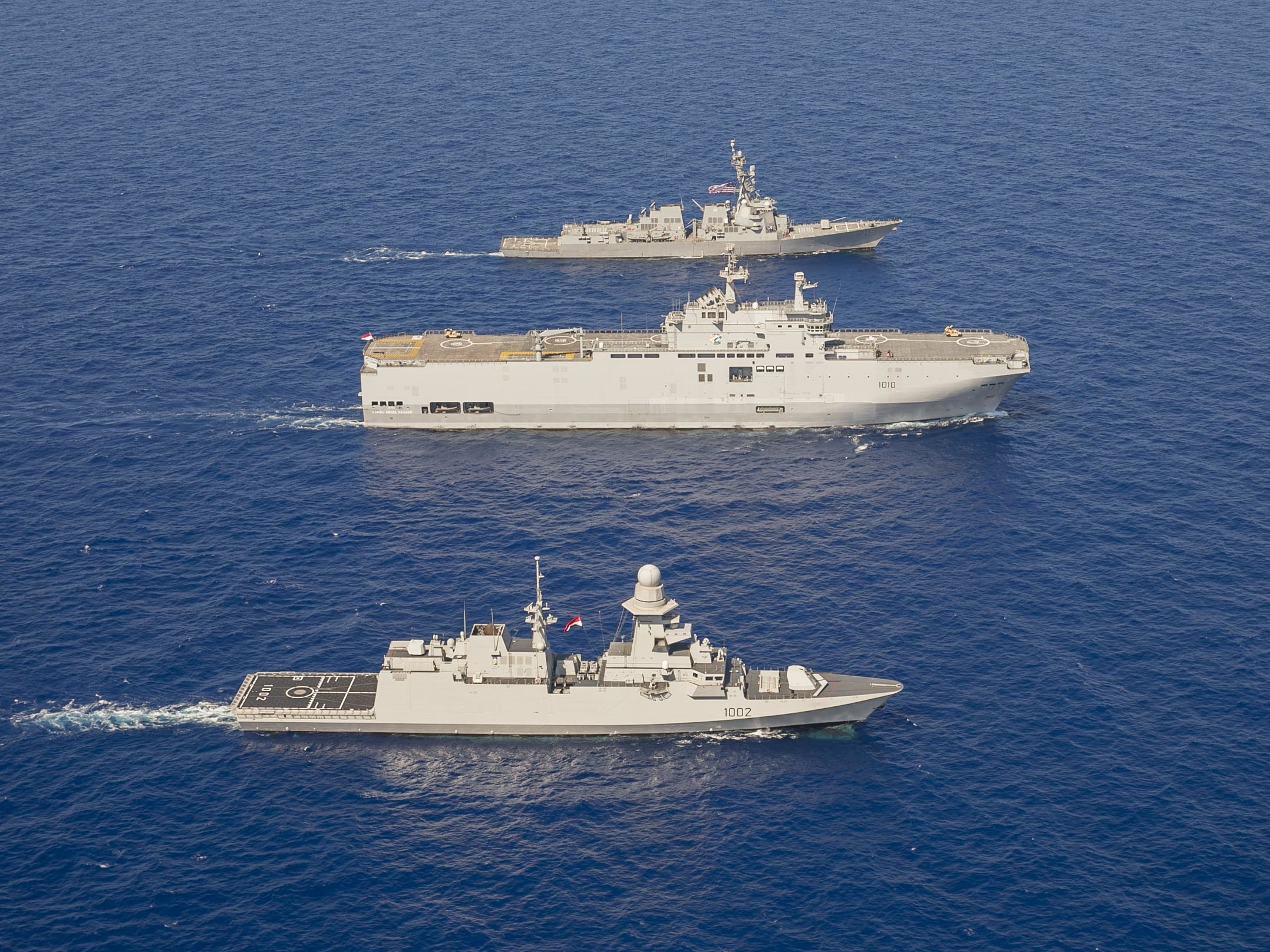
USS Delbert D. Black (DDG-119) (top), ENS Gamal Abdel Nasser (middle), and ENS Al-Galala (bottom) conduct joint operations in the Mediterranean Sea in 2022

Following the peace treaty with Israel, Egypt between 1979 and 2003 acquired about $19 billion in military aid, making it the second-largest non-NATO recipient of US military aid, after Israel. Egypt received about $30 billion in economic aid within the same time frame. In 2009, the US provided military assistance of $1.3 billion (equivalent to $1.95 billion in 2025), and economic assistance of $250 million (equivalent to $375.2 million in 2025) In 1989, both Egypt and Israel became major non-NATO allies of the United States.

Military cooperation between the US and Egypt is probably the strongest aspect of their strategic partnership. General Anthony Zinni, the former Commandant of the US Central Command (CENTCOM), once said, "Egypt is the most important country in my area of responsibility because of the access it gives me to the region." Egypt was also described during the Clinton administration as the most prominent player in the Arab world and a key US ally in the Middle East. Military assistance to Egypt was considered part of the administration's strategy to maintain the continued availability of Persian Gulf energy resources and secure the Suez Canal, which serves as an important international oil route and a critical route for US warships transiting between the Mediterranean and the Indian Ocean or the Persian Gulf.

Egypt is the strongest military power in Africa, and, according to Jaffee Center for Strategic Studies' annual Middle East Strategic Balance, the largest in the Middle East.

In February 2021, the US State Department announced a possible sale of missiles to Egypt worth $197 million. The sale was reportedly announced days after the Egyptian government had detained family members of a human rights activist having dual citizenship of the US and Egypt, Mohamed Soltan. He leads a non-profit organization called the Freedom Initiative that demands attention to the impunity and the disregard for human rights in Egypt under President Abdel Fattah el-Sisi.

The Committee to Protect Journalists on 22 April 2021 collaborated with 13 other civil society groups and sent an open letter urging the Biden administration against waiving the human rights situation while IT sent military aid to Egypt for fiscal year 2020. Rights groups including Amnesty International, DAWN, and Human Rights Watch, urged the administration to refrain from using the national security waiver when it released military aid.

In January 2022, the Biden administration decided to reprogram $130 million in fiscal year 2020 Foreign Military Financing (FMF) by citing the country's failure to improve its human rights records. In September 2021, the US split the $300 million tranche of military aid pending the Egyptian government's fulfillment of human rights conditions. Nearly 19 human rights organizations welcomed the decision intended for el-Sisi's brutal government. However, at the same time, they denounced the Biden administration for authorizing $2.5 billion in arms sales to Egypt and obligating $1 billion in fiscal year 2021 FMF. Human Rights Watch said that the administration's decision undermined the very purpose of reprogramming the funds and also wasted “a meaningful step toward fulfilling its promise to “center” human rights in its relationship with Egypt.”

=== Counterterrorism ===
Despite differences and periods of friction in relations between the countries, American–Egyptian relations under Mubarak had evolved to move beyond the Middle East peace process towards an independent bilateral friendship. It was in the Americans' interest for Egypt to present a moderate voice in Arab councils and to persuade other Arab states to join the peace process and to normalize relations with the US.

However, Egyptian–American relations have lately become somewhat tenser. That is to a great extent because of the Egyptians' unwillingness to send troops to Afghanistan and Iraq in peace stabilization missions. Egypt strongly backed the US in its war against international terrorism after the September 11 attacks of 2001 but refused to send troops to Afghanistan during and after the war. Egypt also opposed US military intervention of March 2003 in Iraq through its membership in the African Union and the Arab League, and continued to oppose US occupation of the country after the war and refused to comply with US requests to send troops to the country, even under a UN umbrella.

The issue of participation in the postwar construction efforts in Iraq has been controversial in Egypt and the rest of the Arab world. Opponents say that the war was illegal and that it is necessary to wait until Iraq has a legal representative government to deal with it. On the other hand, supporters of participation argued that the responsibility to protect Iraq and to help during its time of crisis should prevail to guide the Egyptian action in Iraq, which thinks otherwise.

As of 2011, US officials quoted in USA Today described Egyptian security and military as having shared "valuable intelligence" and providing other "useful counterterrorism assistance" in the 1980 and the 1990s and "particularly in the decade since the 9/11 attacks." Under Mubarak and his intelligence chief, Omar Suleiman, the US had "an important partnership" in counterterrorism.

When the US made cuts in military aid to Egypt after the overthrow of Morsi and the crackdown on the Muslim Brotherhood, it continued funding for counterterrorism, border security, and security operations in the Sinai Peninsula and the Gaza Strip, which Israel considers very important to its security.

== Resident diplomatic missions ==
of Egypt in the United States

- Washington, D.C. (Embassy)
- Chicago (Consulate-General)
- Houston (Consulate-General)
- Los Angeles (Consulate-General)
- New York City (Consulate-General)

of the United States in Egypt

- Cairo (Embassy)

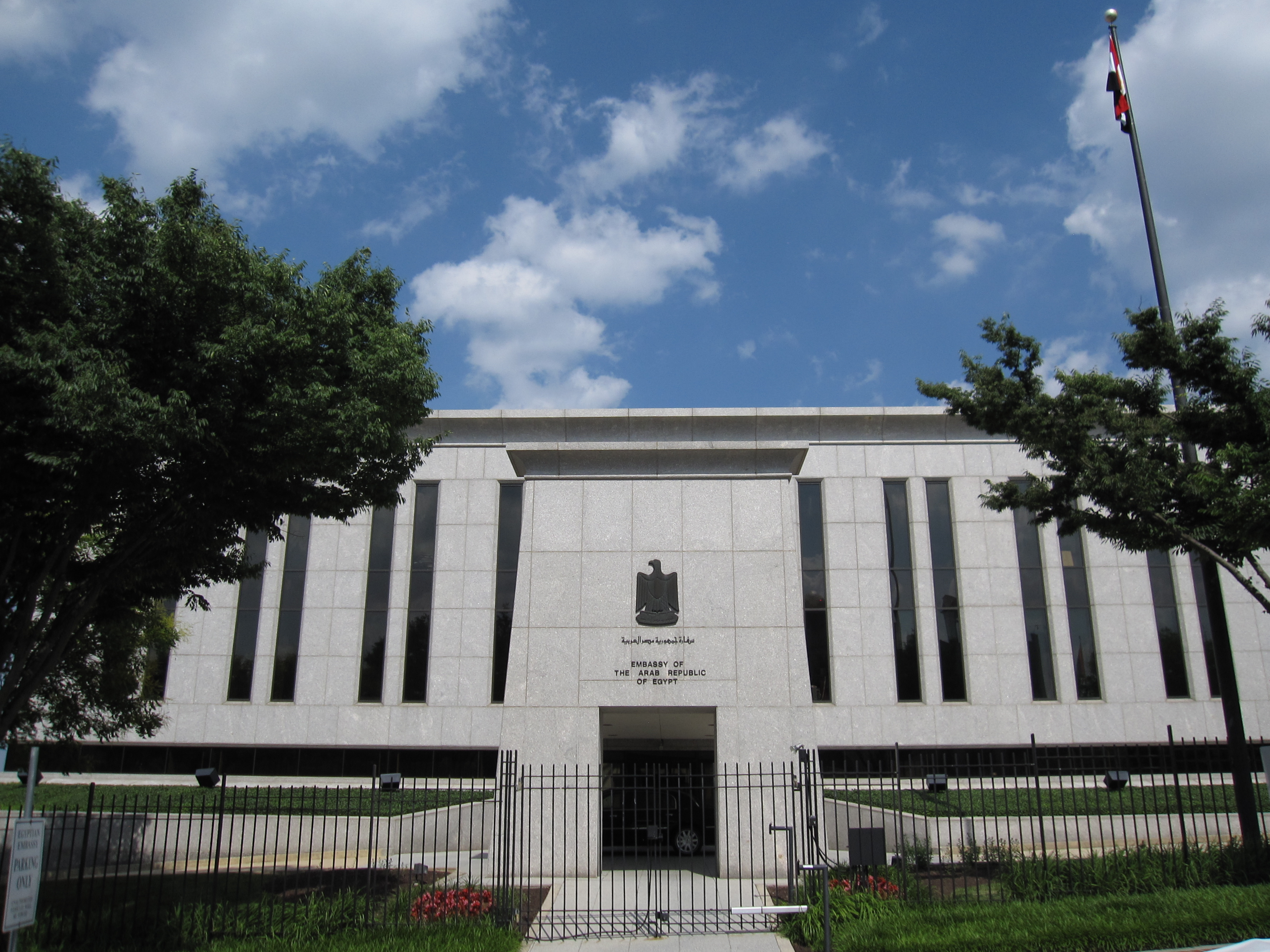
Embassy of Egypt in Washington, D.C.

== Gallery ==
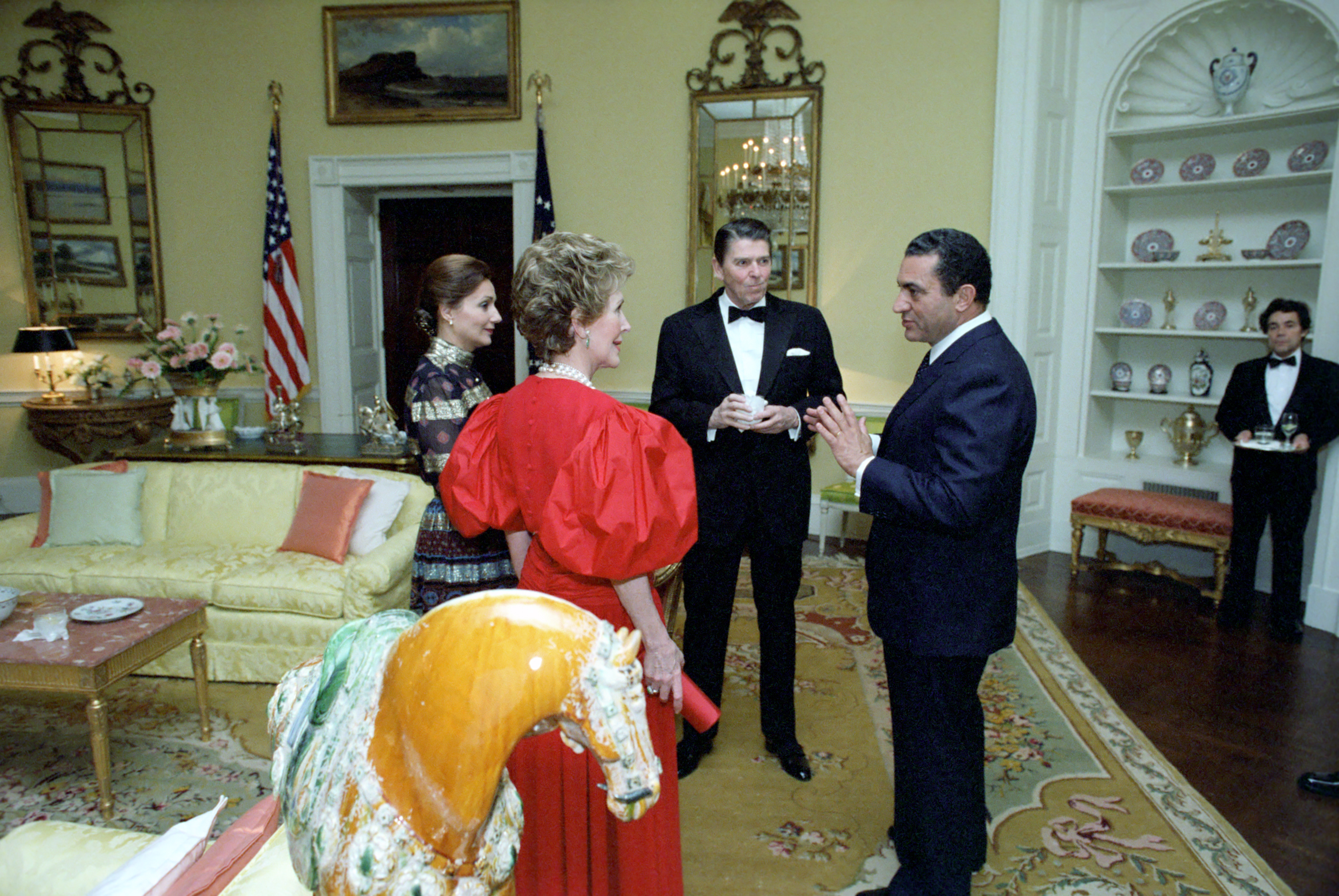
US President Ronald Reagan and Nancy Reagan meets Egyptian President Hosni Mubarak and Suzanne Mubarak at Mubarak's state visit to Washington, March 1982

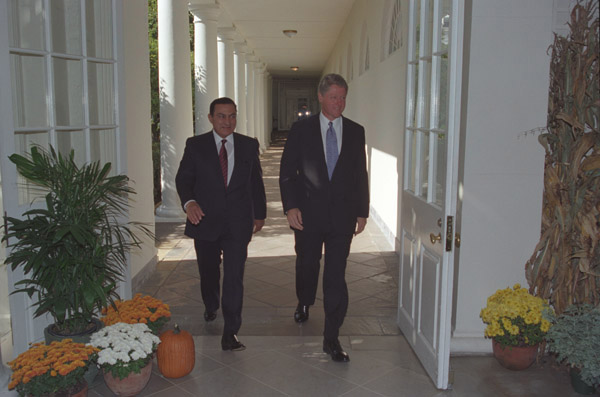
US President Bill Clinton Walking with Egyptian President Hosni Mubarak along the White House Colonnade, October 1993

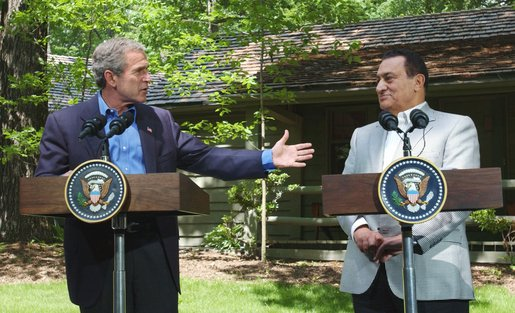
US President George W. Bush with Egyptian President Hosni Mubarak at Camp David in 2002.

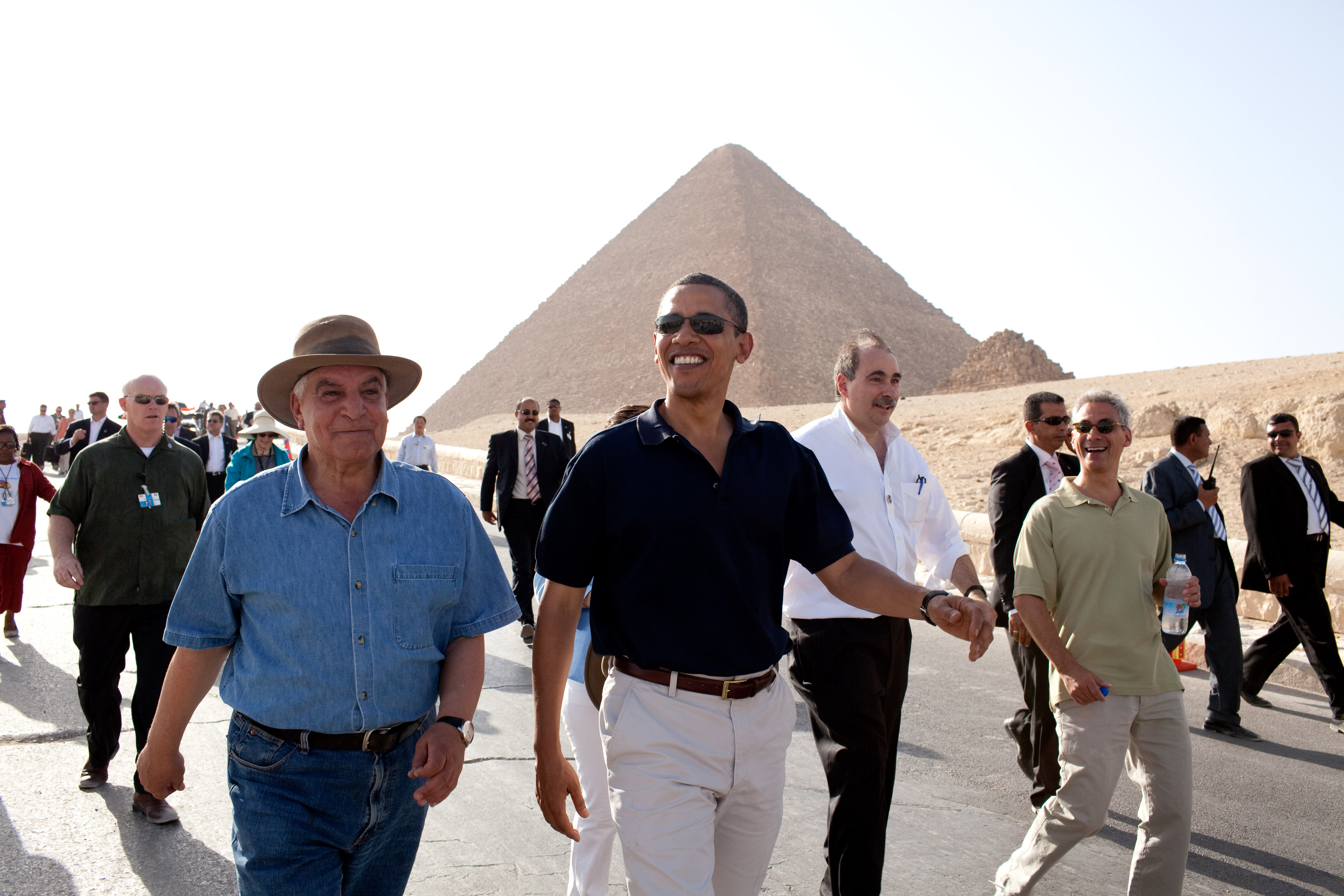
US President Barack Obama tours the Pyramids with Egyptian Egyptologist Zahi Hawass during his famous Cairo speech about a "change" in the US relations with the Islamic world, June 2009.

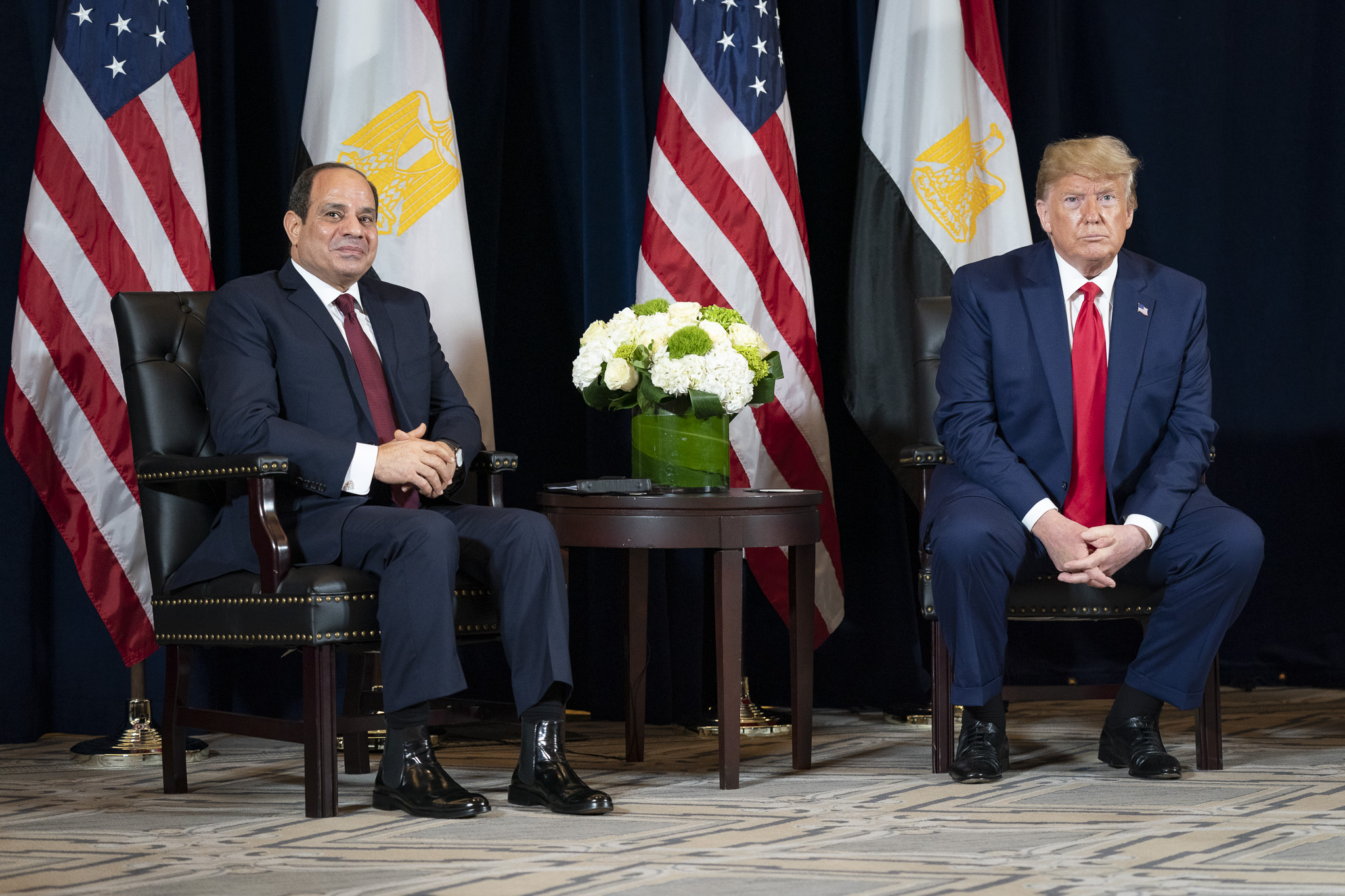
Egyptian President Abdel Fattah el-Sisi with US President Donald Trump at the 45th G7 summit in Biarritz, September 2019.

== See also ==
- Foreign relations of Egypt
- Foreign relations of the United States
- Egyptian Americans
- United States foreign policy in the Middle East

== Sources ==
- Bass, Warren (2003). Support Any Friend: Kennedy's Middle East and the Making of the U.S.-Israel Alliance. New York: Oxford University Press. ISBN 0195165802.
- Burns, William J. (1985). Economic aid and American policy toward Egypt, 1955-1981. Albany, NY: State University of New York Press.
- Gaddis, John Lewis (1998). We Now Know: Rethinking Cold War History. Oxford: Oxford University Press. ISBN 978-0-1987-8071-7.
- Neff, Donald (1981). Warriors at Suez : Eisenhower Takes America into the Middle-East. New York: Simon and Schuster. ISBN 978-0-6714-1010-0.
- Sayed-Ahmed, Muhammad Add al-Wahab (1993). "Relations between Egypt and the United States of America in the 1950s". In Tripp, Charles (ed.). Contemporary Egypt: Through Egyptian Eyes : Essays in Honour of Professor P.J. Vatikiotis. Routledge. pp. 89–99. ISBN 978-0-4150-6103-2.
- Thornhill, M. T. (1 September 2004). "Britain, the United States and the Rise of an Egyptian Leader: The Politics and Diplomacy of Nasser's Consolidation of Power, 1952-4". The English Historical Review. 119 (483): 892–921. doi:10.1093/ehr/119.483.892. ISSN 0013-8266.
