= OMEGA Memorandum =

Secret U.S. informal policy

The 'OMEGA' Memorandum of March 28, 1956, was a secret U.S. informal policy memorandum drafted by Secretary of State John Foster Dulles for President Dwight D. Eisenhower. The goal of the policy was to reduce the influence in the Middle East of Egyptian President Gamal Abdel Nasser because he seemed to be leaning in favor of the Soviet Union and he failed to provide the leadership that Dulles and Eisenhower had desired toward settling the Arab-Israeli conflict. Eisenhower approved the memorandum. Around the same time, the British government formulated a similar strategy. The United States and the United Kingdom intended to coordinate activities between them to implement the new strategies in successive stages.

== Background ==
In 1953, the Eisenhower administration formulated a foreign policy called the “New Look.” In addition to continuing the prior administration’s goal of containing the Soviet threat, the New Look sought to liberate those suffering under communism and to support emerging nations in the Third World. In regard to the Middle East, Eisenhower and Dulles saw Egypt, the most populous and largest Arab country, as key to achieving their goals of ending the conflict between Israel and its Arab neighbors, protecting the region’s oil supplies and bringing stability across the Middle East. In hope of gaining influence over Nasser’s actions, the Eisenhower administration adopted a strategy of offering Egypt technical, economic and military assistance. As part of this strategy, discussions were held about possible funding for a High Dam project at Aswan. Nasser viewed the proposed project, which would offer benefits of increasing arable land and providing cheap electrical energy to the Egyptian people, as a high priority.

The New Look proved ineffective in influencing Nasser to take favorable action toward Western goals. Nasser’s actions frustrated and disappointed the United States and its allies in a number of ways, including: (1) On September 27, 1955, Nasser announced the purchase of a huge supply of arms ostensibly from Czechoslovakia but actually supplied by the Soviet Union. That shocked the U.S. administration and created fear that Egypt was moving closer to the Soviets and away from Western influence. (2) Nasser endorsed a rebellion in Algeria against France, resulting in complaints by the French about American and British assistance to Egypt. (3) Nasser refused to join the Baghdad Pact. The project consisted of a proposed regional defense agreement among Turkey, Pakistan, Iraq, and Iran designed to protect the region from potential Soviet threat. (4) Finally, Nasser refused to cooperate with a joint American-British secret peace plan named Alpha, which aimed to convince Egyptian and Israeli leaders to end hostilities through mutual concessions.

In light of Nasser’s continued refusal to cooperate with U.S. interests in the region, in late March 1956 Eisenhower and Dulles reversed their strategy toward Egypt. Instead of its hitherto-friendly policy of appeasement and aid, the administration formulated a set of measures, drawn up by the State Department, that sought to undermine Nasser and reduce Egypt’s influence in the region. The new initiative, code-named OMEGA, was approved on March 28, 1956, by Eisenhower and top State and Defense Department policymakers.

== Provisions ==
The secret OMEGA Memorandum included three stages to be implemented in succession as needed to achieve its aims. The overarching purpose was to effect a reorientation of Nasser’s policies toward cooperation with the West while diminishing what were seen as his harmful attempts to influence other Middle East countries. Pertaining to measures directed at Egypt, the provisions included a delay by the United States and Britain in concluding negotiations on financing the Aswan Dam, a continued delay on pending Egyptian requests for grains and oil, suspension of a decision on a CARE program of economic aid, denial of export licenses covering arms shipments to Egypt by the United States and the United Kingdom and an offer of expanded radio facilities to Iraq to block Egyptian broadcasts. State Department analysis, produced on the same day as the presentation of the OMEGA Memorandum, clarified that the first phase of the plan was designed to warn Nasser that he was in danger of earning the hostility of the Western powers while still allowing for the possibility that he could return “to the fold without too much loss of face.” These measures were to be implemented immediately and last until approximately the end of April 1956. Additionally, the United States would work to improve relations with other countries of the Middle East at the expense of Egypt and use the United Nations to reduce the possibility of war between the Arab countries and Israel. The plans also included bolstering anti-Egyptian Arab conservative forces by fostering cooperation between Iraq and Jordan, providing support for Iraq’s government and offering economic aid to pro-Western elements in Lebanon.

The second phase of OMEGA was estimated to last approximately to the end of July 1956 and intensify the phase one measures as well as build up support for the Baghdad Pact. During this phase, efforts would be made to support an alternate Arab leader to replace Nasser, with King Saud of Saudi Arabia considered a favorite contender for this role by Eisenhower. Another goal was to seek arms suppliers for Israel as direct supply of arms by the United States was advised against by Dulles as being too antagonistic to the Arab region.

In the third phase of OMEGA, all measures of the earlier stages would be continued, with the addition of a focus on Egypt’s internal affairs. This phase called for the permanent shelving of funding for the Aswan Dam and initiation of a covert action program to interfere in Egypt’s domestic affairs.

== Impact ==
Instead of forcing Nasser to comply with Western aims, the OMEGA plan yielded his defiance. In response to the American-British effort to isolate him, he expanded his military, economic and political ties to the Soviets and to China. Nasser’s public recognition of Communist China in May 1956 was an example. This action shocked and angered the West.

America’s opposition to Nasser became public on July 19, 1956, when Dulles informed the Egyptian ambassador that the United States would not support the Aswan Dam project. Nasser was enraged and considered this decision an attack on his regime and an encouragement to the Egyptian people to tear it down. In retaliation, on July 26, 1956, Nasser gave a speech in which, using the pre-arranged code name “de Lesseps,” he ordered assault teams to seize offices of the Suez Maritime Canal Company. At the conclusion of the speech, he astonished the world by announcing that Egypt had just nationalized the Suez Canal.

According to Gerges, “It would be no exaggeration to argue that the immediate origins of the Suez Crisis lay in the Czech arms deal and the subsequent hostile shift of policy adopted by the U.S. and British governments.” The ramifications of the ensuing Suez Crisis were immense. Nasser was ultimately seen as a victor. “The big losers of the Suez adventure were the United Kingdom and France. Both had to abandon their dreams of restoring their colonial glory,” and the United States realized that it could not make Egypt do its bidding.

The Eisenhower administration, despite the failure of the OMEGA plan up to that time to control Nasser, continued to pursue the plan’s strategies. In August 1956, the administration sent former Undersecretary of Defense Robert Anderson to meet with the Saudi regime in an attempt to secure an alternate to Nasser as leader of the Arab world. The mission was unsuccessful. It was again clear that the OMEGA plan had failed to produce desired results. The Suez Crisis reached a climax on October 29, 1956, when Israel, the United Kingdom, and France attacked Egypt. Further implementation of the OMEGA plan was shelved in the wake of the war. A new strategy known as the Eisenhower Doctrine, which was designed to shield pro-Western governments from Soviet influence, was adopted.
