= Comoros–United States relations =

- Comoros: United States

Comoros–United States relations are the international relations between the Comoros and the United States. The United States recognized the Comorian Government in 1977.

== Politics ==
Both nations are members of the United Nations (UN), International Monetary Fund (IMF), and World Bank (WB). The Comoros is an observer in the World Trade Organization, of which the United States is a member.

== Trade ==
Although 19% of The Comoros' exports are to the United States, only 1% of their imports are from the United States. The United States has signed a trade agreement with the Common Market for Eastern and Southern Africa (COMESA), of which The Comoros is a member. The Comoros is also eligible for preferential trade benefits with the United States under the African Growth and Opportunity Act.

== Embassies ==
The United States does not have an embassy in Comoros, but the United States Ambassador to Madagascar is also accredited as the United States Ambassador to Comoros. Similarly Comoros does not have an embassy in Washington D.C., but their permanent representative to the United Nations (at New York City), is accredited as the Comorian Ambassador to the United States.
