= Kingdom of Württemberg–United States relations =

- Württemberg: United States

The Kingdom of Württemberg and the United States began relations in 1825 when both countries mutually recognized each other. Relations continued when Württemberg joined the German Empire in 1871. Relations would eventually end with World War I when the U.S. declared war on Germany.

== History ==
The first known act of mutual recognition between the United States and the Kingdom of Württemberg occurred on November 21, 1825, when U.S. Secretary of State Henry Clay granted an exequatur to Christian Mayer Esq. to serve as Consul General for the Kingdom of Württemberg at Baltimore.

The first U.S. consulate opened in Württemberg on October 13, 1842, and closed on March 3, 1843. The U.S. later opened a consulate in Stuttgart on March 3, 1847, which closed in September 1985.

On April 10, 1844, the Convention Abolishing Droit D’Aubaine and Taxes on Emigration was signed by U.S. Minister to Prussia Henry Wheaton and Württemberg’s Chargé d’Affaires to Prussia Baron de Maucler. Droit d’aubaine was when a state would confiscate all territory and possessions, moveable or immoveable, of the deceased rather than the deceased heirs receiving the property.

On October 13, 1853, the Grand Duchy of Oldenburg signed the Declaration of Accession to the Convention for the Extradition of Criminals, Fugitives from Justice, of June 16, 1852, Between the United States and Prussia for the provision of the extradition of criminals in 1852. At the time that the convention was negotiated, it was deemed that any state of the German Confederation who wished to enter into the convention might do so.

In the 1850s there was little serious trade between the two nations. As with all of the German states that the United States had treaties with after Württemberg joined the German Empire in 1871 there were questions as to whether U.S. officials abided by treaties concluded with Württemberg or with Prussia in dealing with issues of trade, citizenship, or extradition. It was decided that a variety of different circumstances would guide U.S. foreign policy towards German states. First, "where a State has lost its separate existence, as in the case of Hanover and Nassau, no questions can arise." Second, "where no treaty has been negotiated with the Empire, the treaties with the various States which have preserved a separate existence have been resorted to." Despite the Constitution of the German Empire of 1871, which stipulated that the Empire was responsible for treaties, alliances, and representing the Empire amongst nations, the smaller states still retained the right of legation. This included the right to legislate, to grant exequaturs to foreign consuls in their territories, though not to send German consuls abroad, and to enter into conventions with foreign nations as long as they did not concern matters already within the jurisdiction of the Empire or the Emperor.

On July 27, 1868, specially accredited U.S. Minister to the Kingdom of Württemberg George Bancroft signed a naturalization treaty with the Kingdom of Württemberg. At the time, Bancroft was also accredited to Prussia and the North German Confederation and, after 1871, to the German Empire. Yet, although Bancroft was recalled from his position in Berlin in 1874, at his own request, he was never officially recalled from the court of Württemberg. Years after his 1891 death, Bancroft remained listed as the official diplomatic representative of the U.S. in Württemberg.

On July 27, 1868, U.S. Minister to Württemberg George Bancroft and Württemberg’s Minister of Foreign Affairs Charles Baron Varnbüler signed a convention to regulate citizenship between those who emigrated from the United States to Württemberg and vice versa.

In 1867, relations continued when the Kingdom joined the German Empire in 1871 but ended with the outbreak of the First World War and the American declaration of war against Germany.

== See also ==
- Foreign relations of the United States
- Germany–United States relations
- Grand Duchy of Baden–United States relations
- Kingdom of Bavaria–United States relations
- Duchy of Brunswick-Lüneburg–United States relations
- Kingdom of Hanover–United States relations
- German Empire–United States relations
- Hanseatic Republics–United States relations
- Grand Duchy of Hesse–United States relations
- Grand Duchy of Mecklenburg-Schwerin–United States relations
- Grand Duchy of Mecklenburg-Strelitz–United States relations
- Duchy of Nassau–United States relations
- North German Confederation–United States relations
- Grand Duchy of Oldenburg–United States relations
- Prussia–United States relations
- Principality of Schaumburg-Lippe–United States relations
