= Grand Duchy of Hesse–United States relations =

- Hesse: United States

The Grand Duchy of Hesse and the United States began relations in 1829 with mutual recognition going through expansion in 1868 when the grand duchy joined the German Empire in 1871. Relations would eventually end with World War I when the U.S. declared war on Germany.

== History ==
Mutual recognition between the grand duchy and the United States occurred when the first U.S. Consul to Hesse (Hesse-Darndstadt), Frederick Kahl, presented his credentials in 1829. Kahl was appointed on May 14, 1829.

A U.S. Consulate opened in Hesse on May 14, 1829. It closed on August 29, 1872. Another U.S. Consulate in Hessen-Romberg opened on January 23, 1854, but closed on August 15, 1861.

On March 26, 1844, the U.S. and the grand duchy signed the Convention for the Mutual Abolition of the Droit d’Aubaine and Taxes on Emigration. This convention was signed in Berlin by U.S. Minister to Prussia Henry Wheaton and the Grand Duke of Hesse’s Minister to Prussia Baron Schaeffer Bernstein and served to remove "the restrictions which exist in their territories upon the acquisition and transfer of property by their respective citizens and subjects."

When the northern part of Hesse joined the North German Confederation in 1867, it was subject to the laws and stipulations concerning immigration and naturalization that were agreed upon by the United States and the North German Confederation. To facilitate matters, the Grand Duchy of Hesse signed a similar document concerning immigration and naturalization. The agreement was signed in Darmstadt on August 1, 1868, by U.S. Minister to the North German Confederation George Bancroft and the president of the council of state for the Grand Duchy of Hesse Dr. Frederick Baron von Lindelof. George Bancroft signed the naturalization treaty. At the time, Bancroft was also accredited to Prussia and the North German Confederation and, after 1871, to the German Empire. Although Bancroft was recalled from his position in Berlin in 1874, at his own request, he was never officially recalled from the court of Hesse.

In 1871, the entirety of the grand duchy joined German Empire and continued relations from Berlin under a single government. But relations ended with the outbreak of the First World War and the American declaration of war against Germany.

== See also ==
- Foreign relations of the United States
- Germany–United States relations
- Grand Duchy of Baden–United States relations
- Kingdom of Bavaria–United States relations
- Duchy of Brunswick-Lüneburg–United States relations
- Kingdom of Hanover–United States relations
- German Empire–United States relations
- Hanseatic Republics–United States relations
- Grand Duchy of Mecklenburg-Schwerin–United States relations
- Grand Duchy of Mecklenburg-Strelitz–United States relations
- Duchy of Nassau–United States relations
- North German Confederation–United States relations
- Grand Duchy of Oldenburg–United States relations
- Prussia–United States relations
- Principality of Schaumburg-Lippe–United States relations
- Kingdom of Württemberg–United States relations
