= Kingdom of Bavaria–United States relations =

- Bavaria: United States

The Kingdom of Bavaria and the United States began relations in 1833 going through expansion in 1868 when the kingdom joined the German Empire in 1871. Relations would eventually end with World War I when the U.S. declared war on Germany.

== History ==
Formal relations began in 1833 when the U.S. opened a consulate in the kingdom. A letter from U.S. Consul Robert de Ruedorffer dated July 4, 1833, informed Secretary of State Edward Livingston that Ruedorffer will discharge the duties of Consul for the United States in Munich. Today the consulate is the American consulate in Munich. A second consulate opened on December 26, 1843. Other U.S. Consulates opened in the kingdom during the nineteenth century were: Augsburg, which opened on June 26, 1846, and closed on July 28, 1906; Rhenish, which opened on August 4, 1862, and closed on April 21, 1870; Nuremberg, which opened on December 26, 1868, and closed on February 5, 1915; and Bamberg, which opened on January 25, 1892, and closed on May 11, 1908.

On January 21, 1845, the U.S. signed a convention to abolish droit d’aubaine and taxation upon emigration with the Kingdom of Bavaria. Droit d’aubaine was when a state would confiscate all territory and possessions, moveable or immovable, of the deceased rather than the deceased’s heirs receiving the property.

On September 12, 1853, both countries signed an Extradition Convention in London by U.S. Minister to Britain James Buchanan and the Bavarian Envoy Extraordinary and Minister Plenipotentiary at the Court of the Queen of the United Kingdom of Great Britain and Ireland Augustus Baron de Cetto.

On May 26, 1868, the U.S. signed a Naturalization Treaty with the Kingdom of Bavaria. The treaty was negotiated and signed by U.S. Minister to the Kingdom of Bavaria George Bancroft and his Bavarian counterpart, Dr. Otto, Baron of Völderndorff, Councillor of Ministry. At the same time, U.S. Minister Plenipotentiary George Bancroft signed a naturalization treaty with Bavaria. At the time, Bancroft was also accredited to Kingdom of Prussia and the North German Confederation and, after 1871, to the German Empire. Yet, although Bancroft was recalled from his position in Berlin in 1874, at his own request, he was never officially recalled from the court of Bavaria. In 1895, four years after his death, Bancroft still officially stood as the diplomatic representative of the United States to Bavaria.

Relations ended on February 3, 1917, when U.S. President Woodrow Wilson instructed Secretary of State Robert Lansing to notify the German Ambassador to the United States that all diplomatic relations between the U.S. and the German Empire were severed. As the foreign affairs of Imperial Germany were run out of Berlin and decided upon by the Kaiser, this constituted the severance of relations with Bavaria, as part of the German Empire. On April 6, 1917, Wilson declared war on Imperial Germany.

== See also ==
- Foreign relations of the United States
- Germany–United States relations
- Grand Duchy of Baden–United States relations
- Duchy of Brunswick-Lüneburg–United States relations
- Kingdom of Hanover–United States relations
- German Empire–United States relations
- Hanseatic Republics–United States relations
- Grand Duchy of Hesse–United States relations
- Grand Duchy of Mecklenburg-Schwerin–United States relations
- Grand Duchy of Mecklenburg-Strelitz–United States relations
- Duchy of Nassau–United States relations
- North German Confederation–United States relations
- Grand Duchy of Oldenburg–United States relations
- Prussia–United States relations
- Principality of Schaumburg-Lippe–United States relations
- Kingdom of Württemberg–United States relations
