= Duchy of Brunswick–United States relations =

- Brunswick: United States

The Duchy of Brunswick and the United States began relations in 1848 with mutual recognition but both countries never established formal relations. Relations continued in 1867 when the duchy joined the North German Confederation. Relations would eventually end with World War I when the U.S. declared war on Germany.

== History ==
On April 5, 1848, Secretary of State James Buchanan acknowledged the Consul-General of Brunswick in New York City as John Dreyer Esq., which constitutes the first known act of mutual recognition between the United States and the Duchy of Brunswick. The U.S. in return opened its first consulate in the Duchy of Brunswick on March 17, 1856. The consulate would close on July 25, 1916.

On August 21, 1854, the U.S. Secretary of State William L. Marcy and the Consul of the Duke of Brunswick at Mobile, Ala., Dr. Julius Samson, signed a Convention Respecting the Disposition of Property, as they were "animated by the desire to secure and extend, by an amicable convention, the relations happily existing between the two countries." The treaty was negotiated and signed in Washington, D.C.

The Duchy of Brunswick joined the North German Confederation in 1867, to which the U.S. appointed George Bancroft, then U.S. Minister to the Kingdom of Prussia, to serve as the U.S. Minister to. From this point forward, foreign policy of the North German Confederation, and later, after 1871 the German Empire, was made in Berlin, with the German Emperor (who was also the King of Prussia) accrediting ambassadors of foreign nations. On April 6, 1917, President Woodrow Wilson declared war on Imperial Germany.

== See also ==
- Foreign relations of the United States
- Germany–United States relations
- Grand Duchy of Baden–United States relations
- Kingdom of Bavaria–United States relations
- Kingdom of Hanover–United States relations
- German Empire–United States relations
- Hanseatic Republics–United States relations
- Grand Duchy of Hesse–United States relations
- Grand Duchy of Mecklenburg-Schwerin–United States relations
- Grand Duchy of Mecklenburg-Strelitz–United States relations
- Duchy of Nassau–United States relations
- North German Confederation–United States relations
- Grand Duchy of Oldenburg–United States relations
- Prussia–United States relations
- Principality of Schaumburg-Lippe–United States relations
- Kingdom of Württemberg–United States relations
