= Grand Duchy of Baden–United States relations =

- Baden: United States

The Grand Duchy of Baden and the United States began relations in 1832 going through expansion in 1868 when the duchy joined the German Empire in 1871. Relations would eventually end with World War I when the U.S. declared war on Germany.

== History ==
On July 13, 1832, relations formally began when the U.S. opened a consulate in Baden-Baden. Several U.S. consulates were in Freiburg, which opened on March 5, 1891, and closed on May 11, 1908; Kehl, which opened on April 30, 1872, and closed on February 5, 1915; Karlsruhe, which opened on March 3, 1855, and closed on February 18, 1872; and Mannheim on October 26, 1843, and closed on July 8, 1916. The Duchy opened a consulate in New York City on December 20, 1833, with C.F. Hoyer as Consul.

An Extradition Convention was signed on January 30, 1857, by U.S. Minister to the Kingdom of Prussia Peter Dumont Vroom and Baron Marschall de Bieberstein, the Grand Duke of Baden’s Minister at the Court of the King of Prussia. At the time, George Bancroft was also accredited to Prussia and the North German Confederation and, after 1871, to the German Empire. Yet, although Bancroft was recalled from his position in Berlin in 1874, at his own request, he was never officially recalled from the court of Baden. For several years after Bancroft’s death in 1891, he remained listed as U.S. Minister to Baden.

On July 19, 1868, both countries signed a Treaty on Naturalization which allowed for the naturalization of American citizens in Baden and Baden citizens in the United States.

Relations ended on February 3, 1917, when U.S. President Woodrow Wilson instructed Secretary of State Robert Lansing to notify the German Ambassador to the United States that all diplomatic relations between the U.S. and the German Empire were severed. As the foreign affairs of Imperial Germany were run out of Berlin and decided upon by the Kaiser, this constituted the severance of relations with Baden, as part of the German Empire. On April 6, 1917, Wilson declared war on Imperial Germany.

== See also ==
- Foreign relations of the United States
- Germany–United States relations
- Kingdom of Bavaria–United States relations
- Duchy of Brunswick-Lüneburg–United States relations
- Kingdom of Hanover–United States relations
- German Empire–United States relations
- Hanseatic Republics–United States relations
- Grand Duchy of Hesse–United States relations
- Grand Duchy of Mecklenburg-Schwerin–United States relations
- Grand Duchy of Mecklenburg-Strelitz–United States relations
- Duchy of Nassau–United States relations
- North German Confederation–United States relations
- Grand Duchy of Oldenburg–United States relations
- Prussia–United States relations
- Principality of Schaumburg-Lippe–United States relations
- Kingdom of Württemberg–United States relations
