= Prussia–United States relations =

- Prussia: United States

Diplomatic mission
- Embassy of the United States, Berlin

The Kingdom of Prussia and the United States began diplomatic relations in 1785 following the signing of the Treaty of Amity and Commerce, but formal relations were not established until 1797. Relations would eventually end with World War I when the U.S. declared war on Germany.

== History ==
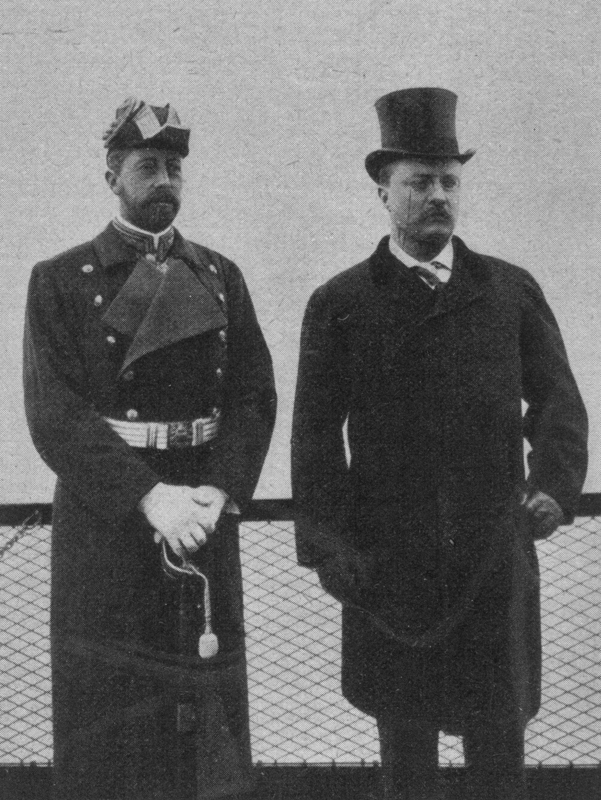
Prince Henry and President Theodore Roosevelt at Shooters Island, New York, February 25, 1902

After the signing of the Treaty of Amity and Commerce, the Kingdom of Prussia became therefore one of the first nations to officially recognize the young American Republic after the Revolution. The Treaty was signed to promote free trade and commerce and became a benchmark for subsequent free trade agreements and treaties. In addition, the treaty demanded the unconditionally humane custody for war prisoners, a novelty at the time. The treaty was renewed in 1799 after negotiations with then-United States Ambassador to Prussia John Quincy Adams. While the U.S. did not have a formal mission to Prussia, the construction of the current embassy to Germany began after the appointment of Adams as the ambassador in Berlin which was the capital of Prussia at the time.

On May 1, 1828, both countries signed a Treaty of Commerce and Navigation which revived both the original Treaty of Amity and Commerce and its renewal in 1799. The treaty after German reunification remained intact as the treaty was regarded as binding and its provisions served for adjustments for commercial relations between Germany and the United States. It was until the outbreak of World War I that the treaty came under question and was no longer in continuance.

By the late 1840s through the 1860s, trade between both countries grew rapidly. In 1846, the United States, Prussia, and Bremen, then the main German harbor for the American trade, founded the Ocean Steam Navigation Company (OSNC), directed against British maritime supremacy in the North Atlantic. In part, the company was subsidized by Prussia. In 1855, Prussian Secretary of Trade August von der Heydt remarked about trade with the U.S. describing "the importance of the United States for us as a market for our products has grown by leaps and bounds from one year to the next, and to such a degree, that the customs duty of that nation is, for our own industrial interests, of greater importance than that of most other states."

During the American Civil War, the Kingdom of Prussia sent military officers to observe the conflict, the most notable being Justus Scheibert. The officers studied Union and Confederate tactics, the use of rail networks, rifled muskets, and logistics. When the Prussian officers returned, they delivered reports that assessed the capability of both American armies to be subpar in performance, citing overreliance on frontal assaults and inefficient supply lines.

After the Austro-Prussian War of 1866, the Kingdom of Hanover and Duchy of Nassau, were subsequently merged directly into the Kingdom of Prussia. From this point, Hanover and Nassau had relations with the United States as a part of the Kingdom of Prussia.

From February 22 and March 11, 1902, Prince Henry of Prussia visited the United States arriving at Shooters Island, New York City with President Theodore Roosevelt. On February 25, Kaiser Wilhelm II's yacht "Meteor III," was christened by Roosevelt's daughter Alice Roosevelt Longworth. Henry then traveled to Washington, D.C. visiting the White House for a state dinner, United States Capitol, attending a memorial service to pay respects to William McKinley who was assassinated in 1901. Henry would then take an extended train trip on a special rail car to the Southern and Western United States with stops at Lookout Mountain, and the Lincoln Monument in Chicago. Henry returned to the East Coast where he visited the state capitol in Boston, reviewed cadets at West Point, New York at United States Military Academy, and was the guest of honor at a reception at the Union League in Philadelphia. Prince Henry left through New York on the "S.S. Deutschland". The visit originally planned to have Henry land in New York, take a train to Washington, D.C., where the Prince would pay his respects to President Roosevelt, visit Cincinnati and Chicago, then return to New York via Niagara Falls.

Relations ended on February 3, 1917, when U.S. President Woodrow Wilson instructed Secretary of State Robert Lansing to notify the German Ambassador to the United States that all diplomatic relations between the U.S. and the German Empire were severed. On April 6, 1917, Wilson declared war on Imperial Germany.

== See also ==
- Foreign relations of the United States
- Prussian scheme, in 1786
- Prussia and the American Civil War
- Grand Duchy of Baden–United States relations
- Kingdom of Bavaria–United States relations
- Duchy of Brunswick-Lüneburg–United States relations
- Kingdom of Hanover–United States relations
- German Empire–United States relations
- Hanseatic Republics–United States relations
- Grand Duchy of Hesse–United States relations
- Grand Duchy of Mecklenburg-Schwerin–United States relations
- Grand Duchy of Mecklenburg-Strelitz–United States relations
- Duchy of Nassau–United States relations
- North German Confederation–United States relations
- Grand Duchy of Oldenburg–United States relations
- Principality of Schaumburg-Lippe–United States relations
- Kingdom of Württemberg–United States relations
