= Principality of Schaumburg-Lippe–United States relations =

- Schaumburg-Lippe: United States

The Principality of Schaumburg-Lippe and the United States mutually recognized each other in 1845, but never formally established diplomatic relations. Relations continued when the principality joined the North German Confederation in 1867 then joined the German Empire in 1871. Relations would eventually end with World War I when the U.S. declared war on Germany.

== History ==
On June 7, 1854, Schaumburg-Lippe signed the Declaration of Accession to the Convention for the Extradition of Criminals, Fugitive from Justice, of June 16, 1852 between the United States and Prussia and other states of the German Confederation in Bückeburg. This agreement provided for the reciprocal extradition of fugitive criminals in special cases between Schaumburg-Lippe and the United States.

In 1867, the principality joined the North German Confederation and continued relations under the Confederation as a result of the Austro-Prussian War. Relations further continued when it joined with the German Empire in 1871, but ended with the outbreak of the First World War and the American declaration of war against Germany.

== See also ==
- Foreign relations of the United States
- Germany–United States relations
- Grand Duchy of Baden–United States relations
- Kingdom of Bavaria–United States relations
- Duchy of Brunswick-Lüneburg–United States relations
- Kingdom of Hanover–United States relations
- German Empire–United States relations
- Hanseatic Republics–United States relations
- Grand Duchy of Hesse–United States relations
- Grand Duchy of Mecklenburg-Schwerin–United States relations
- Grand Duchy of Mecklenburg-Strelitz–United States relations
- Duchy of Nassau–United States relations
- North German Confederation–United States relations
- Grand Duchy of Oldenburg–United States relations
- Prussia–United States relations
- Kingdom of Württemberg–United States relations
