= United Kingdom declaration of war on Germany =

United Kingdom declaration of war on Germany may refer to:

- United Kingdom declaration of war upon Germany (1914)
- United Kingdom declaration of war on Germany (1939)
