= Grand Duchy of Oldenburg–United States relations =

- Oldenburg: United States

The Grand Duchy of Oldenburg and the United States began mutual recognition in 1829 but never established formal relations. Relations continued when the grand duchy joined the German Empire in 1871. Relations would eventually end with World War I when the U.S. declared war on Germany.

== History ==
Recognition began on December 2, 1829, when U.S. Secretary of State Martin Van Buren issued an exequatur to Frederick A. Mensch Esq. as Consul for Augustus, Grand Duke of Oldenburg at New York.

On March 10, 1847, the United States and the Grand Duchy of Oldenburg signed the Declaration of Accession to the Treaty of Commerce and Navigation with Hanover, to regulate trade, commerce, and navigation between the U.S. and Oldenburg. The declaration was signed by U.S. Special Agent Ambrose Dudley Mann and Oldenburg’s head of Foreign Affairs, W.E. de Beaulieu Marconnay.

On December 30, 1853, the Grand Duchy of Oldenburg signed the Declaration of Accession to the Convention for the Extradition of Criminals, Fugitives from Justice, of June 16, 1852, Between the United States and Prussia and other states of the German Confederation, to establish reciprocal extradition of fugitive criminals in special cases.

In 1867, the grand duchy joined the North German Confederation as a result of the Austro-Prussian War and continued relations under the Confederation. Relations further continued when it joined with the German Empire in 1871, but ended with the outbreak of the First World War and the American declaration of war against Germany.

== See also ==
- Foreign relations of the United States
- Germany–United States relations
- Grand Duchy of Baden–United States relations
- Kingdom of Bavaria–United States relations
- Duchy of Brunswick-Lüneburg–United States relations
- Kingdom of Hanover–United States relations
- German Empire–United States relations
- Hanseatic Republics–United States relations
- Grand Duchy of Hesse–United States relations
- Grand Duchy of Mecklenburg-Schwerin–United States relations
- Grand Duchy of Mecklenburg-Strelitz–United States relations
- Duchy of Nassau–United States relations
- North German Confederation–United States relations
- Prussia–United States relations
- Principality of Schaumburg-Lippe–United States relations
- Kingdom of Württemberg–United States relations
