= North German Confederation–United States relations =

- Germany: United States

After the Austro-Prussian War the North German Confederation was established in 1866 with the United States recognizing the Confederation in 1867. Formal diplomatic relations were never established. Four years later the Confederation later merged with the German Empire where relations continued.

== History ==
Following the establishment of the North German Confederation on July 1, 1867, on November 20, 1867, the U.S. Minister to Prussia, George Bancroft, informed Secretary of State William H. Seward that he had attended the opening of the North German Parliament. He requested, however, that the Secretary formally notify him of the intentions of the U.S. Government concerning the question of the recognition of the North German Confederation. On December 9, 1867, Secretary Seward approved of Bancroft's decision to attend the opening of the North German Parliament since he was the officially accredited U.S. Minister to the Prussian King Wilhelm I, who was also the hereditary President of the North German Confederation. Furthermore, Seward informed Bancroft that he would disseminate a description of the Confederation's flag so that its ships would be welcomed in American waters. This exchange between Seward and Bancroft implicitly signified a formal recognition of the North German Confederation by the United States.

The U.S. sent George Bancroft to serve as Minister of the North German Confederation, in addition to Bancroft's 1867 commission as U.S. Minister to Prussia. On February 22, 1868, Bancroft concluded the Naturalization Convention with the North German Union to "regulate the citizenship of those persons who emigrate from the North German Confederation to the United States of America, and from the United States of America to the territory of the North German Confederation."

When the North German Union was abolished by the creation of the German Empire in 1871, the United States recognized the legitimacy of and established diplomatic relations with the German Empire. At this point the North German Union was defunct.

== See also ==
- Foreign relations of the United States
- Germany–United States relations
- Grand Duchy of Baden–United States relations
- Kingdom of Bavaria–United States relations
- Duchy of Brunswick-Lüneburg–United States relations
- Kingdom of Hanover–United States relations
- German Empire–United States relations
- Hanseatic Republics–United States relations
- Grand Duchy of Hesse–United States relations
- Grand Duchy of Mecklenburg-Schwerin–United States relations
- Grand Duchy of Mecklenburg-Strelitz–United States relations
- Duchy of Nassau–United States relations
- Grand Duchy of Oldenburg–United States relations
- Prussia–United States relations
- Principality of Schaumburg-Lippe–United States relations
- Kingdom of Württemberg–United States relations
