= Stephen Salisbury III =

American philanthropist

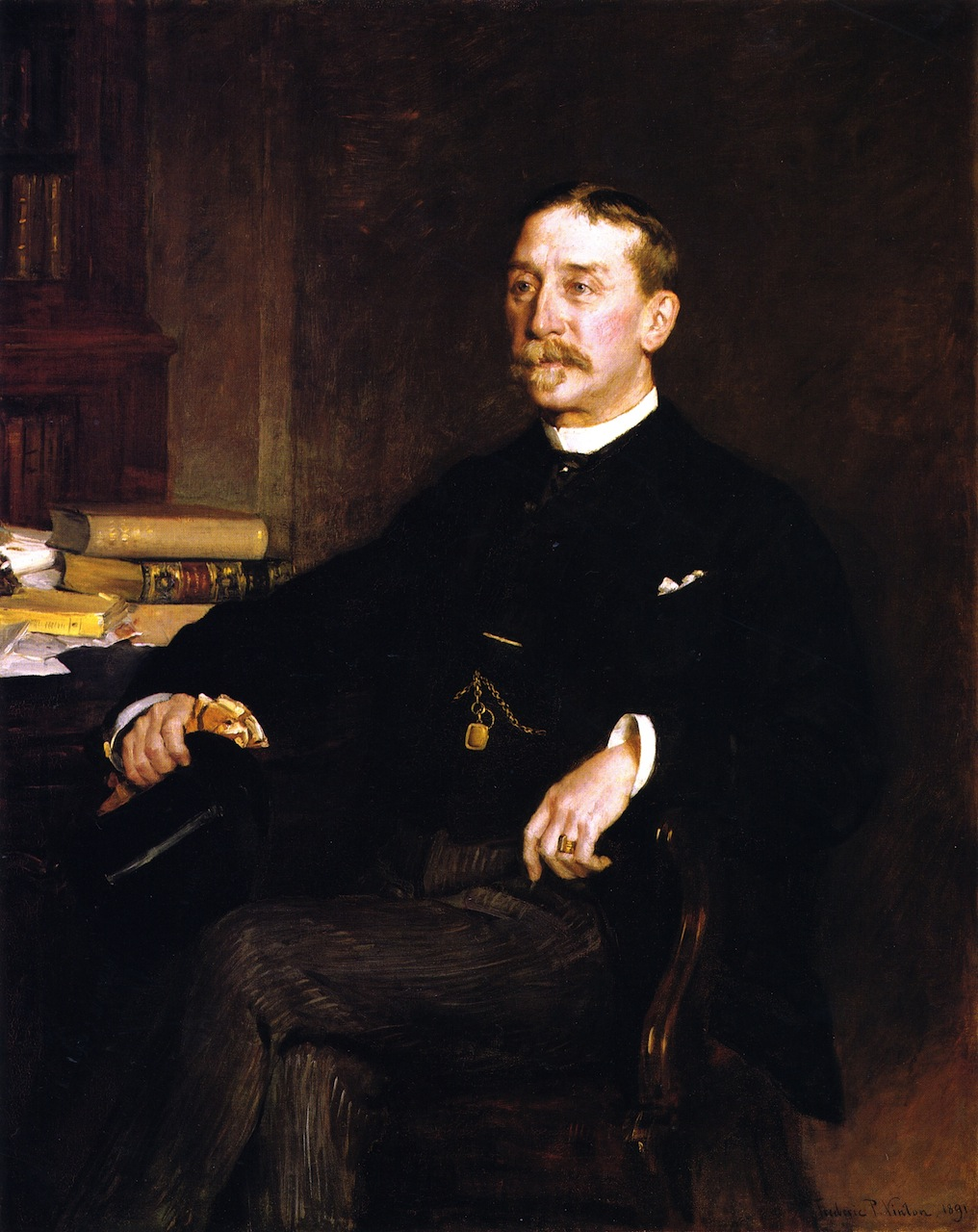
- Portrait by Frederic Porter Vinton

Member of the Massachusetts Senate
- In office 1893–1895

Personal details
- Born: March 31, 1835 Worcester, Massachusetts
- Died: November 16, 1905 (aged 70) Worcester, Massachusetts
- Party: Republican

Stephen Salisbury III (1835–1905), also referred to as Stephen Salisbury Jr., was an American businessman, lawyer, and politician. The son of a wealthy landowner, Salisbury helped manage the family's extensive properties and businesses in Worcester County, Massachusetts. Like his father, Salisbury served in the State Senate, was president of the Worcester National Bank, and directed the Worcester & Nashua Railroad. He was a trustee of the Worcester City Hospital and the Worcester Polytechnic Institute.

== Biography ==
Stephen Salisbury III was born in Worcester on March 31, 1835. He graduated from Harvard College in 1856, and studied abroad for two years at Friedrich Wilhelm University. He received a degree from Harvard Law School in 1861, and was admitted to the bar that October.

Like his father, he maintained a long association with the American Antiquarian Society. He was elected a member in 1863, served on its board of councilors from 1847 to 1884, as vice-president from 1884 to 1887, and as president from 1887 until his death in 1905.

He was also an active member of the Worcester County Horticultural Society, servings as president from 1879 to 1881.

A Republican, he was a member of the Massachusetts Senate from 1893 to 1895.

In 1896, along with a group of prominent citizens of Worcester, he founded the Worcester Art Museum. In 1900, he erected the Bancroft Tower, in honor of George Bancroft, a friend of Salisbury's father. Salisbury died from pneumonia at his home in Worcester on November 16, 1905, leaving his extensive collection of mostly American art to the museum. He also bequeathed $3 million to the museum.

Salisbury dedicated part of his time and economic resources to the research and popularization of the Mayan culture in the Yucatan Peninsula. He wrote a number of articles in the Proceedings of the American Antiquarian Society about the subject, such as: The Mayas, the sources of their culture, The statue of Chac Mool, Terracota figures from Isla Mujeres, The K'atun of the Mayan History.
