= Grand Duchy of Mecklenburg-Strelitz–United States relations =

- Mecklenburg-Strelitz: United States

The Grand Duchy of Mecklenburg-Strelitz and the United States mutually recognized each other in 1853, but never formally established diplomatic relations. Relations continued when the grand duchy joined the German Empire in 1871. Relations would eventually end with World War I when the U.S. declared war on Germany.

== History ==
Mutual recognition between both countries occurred on December 2, 1853, when the Government of Mecklenburg-Strelitz signed the Declaration of Accession to the Convention for the Extradition of Criminals, Fugitive from Justice, of June 16, 1852, between the United States and Prussia and other states of the German Confederation to provide for the "reciprocal extradition of fugitive criminals, in special cases."

U.S. archival materials suggest that the date of mutual recognition may have been as early as May 13, 1834, when U.S. Secretary of State Louis McLane granted an exequatur to Leon Herckenrath as Consul of the Grand Duchy of Mecklenburg at Charleston, South Carolina. Unfortunately, this correspondence and others in the Department of State archives doesn't designate which Grand Duchy of Mecklenburg Herckenrath represented.

In 1867, the grand duchy joined the North German Confederation and continued relations under the Confederation. Relations further continued when it joined with the German Empire in 1871, but ended with the outbreak of the First World War and the American declaration of war against Germany.

== See also ==
- Foreign relations of the United States
- Germany–United States relations
- Grand Duchy of Baden–United States relations
- Kingdom of Bavaria–United States relations
- Duchy of Brunswick-Lüneburg–United States relations
- Kingdom of Hanover–United States relations
- German Empire–United States relations
- Hanseatic Republics–United States relations
- Grand Duchy of Hesse–United States relations
- Grand Duchy of Mecklenburg-Schwerin–United States relations
- Duchy of Nassau–United States relations
- North German Confederation–United States relations
- Grand Duchy of Oldenburg–United States relations
- Prussia–United States relations
- Principality of Schaumburg-Lippe–United States relations
- Kingdom of Württemberg–United States relations
