= Grand Duchy of Mecklenburg-Schwerin–United States relations =

- Mecklenburg-Schwerin: United States

The Grand Duchy of Mecklenburg-Schwerin and the United States mutually recognized each other in 1816, but formal relations were never established. Relations continued when the grand duchy joined the German Empire in 1871. Relations would eventually end with World War I when the U.S. declared war on Germany.

== History ==
The first known act of mutual recognition between the United States and Mecklenburg-Schwerin was in 1816 when John M. Forbes established the first U.S. Consul in the Grand Duchy of Mecklenburg-Schwerin. Forbes was appointed to the post on January 22, 1816.

On December 9, 1847, the Grand Duchy of Mecklenburg-Schwerin signed the Declaration of Accession to the Stipulations and Provisions of the Treaty with Hanover on June 10, 1846. The agreement was signed in Schwerin by the Mecklenburg-Schwerin Minister, L. de Liitzow, and U.S. Special Agent Ambrose Dudley Mann.

On November 26, 1853, the Grand Duchy of Mecklenburg-Schwerin signed the Declaration of Accession to the Convention for the Extradition of Criminals, Fugitive from Justice, of June 16, 1852, between the United States and Prussia and other states of the German Confederation to provide for the "reciprocal extradition of fugitive criminals, in special cases."

In 1871, the entirety of the grand duchy joined German Empire and continued relations from Berlin under a single government. But relations ended with the outbreak of the First World War and the American declaration of war against Germany.

== See also ==
- Foreign relations of the United States
- Germany–United States relations
- Grand Duchy of Baden–United States relations
- Kingdom of Bavaria–United States relations
- Duchy of Brunswick-Lüneburg–United States relations
- Kingdom of Hanover–United States relations
- German Empire–United States relations
- Hanseatic Republics–United States relations
- Grand Duchy of Hesse–United States relations
- Grand Duchy of Mecklenburg-Strelitz–United States relations
- Duchy of Nassau–United States relations
- North German Confederation–United States relations
- Grand Duchy of Oldenburg–United States relations
- Prussia–United States relations
- Principality of Schaumburg-Lippe–United States relations
- Kingdom of Württemberg–United States relations
