= German Empire–United States relations =

- German Empire (1848–1849): United States

The German Empire and the United States established relations in 1848. Relations would eventually be terminated a year later in 1849 when the Empire was dissolved and the German Confederation was re-established.

== History ==
The German Empire was created by the Frankfurt Parliament in the spring of 1848, following the March Revolution. The Empire struggled to be recognized by both German and foreign states. The German states, represented by the Federal Convention of the German Confederation, on 12 July 1848, acknowledged the Central German Government. In the following months, however, the larger German states did not always accept the decrees and laws of the Central German Government and the Frankfurt Parliament. Several foreign states recognized the Central Government and sent ambassadors, among them the U.S.

On July 8, 1848, Secretary of State John M. Clayton informed the former U.S. Minister to Prussia and current Minister to the German Federal Parliament at Frankfurt, Andrew Jackson Donelson, that the United States was prepared to recognize any unified, de facto German Government that "appeared capable of maintaining its power." The United States recognized the Federal Government of Germany on August 9, 1848, when Donelson was commissioned as the new U.S. Minister to the Federal Government of Germany. Formal diplomatic relations were established on August 9 when Donelson was commissioned as the new U.S. Minister to the Federal Government of Germany. Donelson presented his credentials on September 13, 1848.

Donelson served as U.S. Minister until November 2, 1849, when he was recalled following the dissolution of the German revolutionary movement. This constituted full termination of diplomatic relations with the Federal Government of Germany, the U.S. having already accredited a new minister to Prussia, Edward A. Hannegan, on March 22, 1849.

== See also ==
- Foreign relations of the United States
- Germany–United States relations
- Grand Duchy of Baden–United States relations
- Kingdom of Bavaria–United States relations
- Duchy of Brunswick-Lüneburg–United States relations
- Kingdom of Hanover–United States relations
- Hanseatic Republics–United States relations
- Grand Duchy of Hesse–United States relations
- Grand Duchy of Mecklenburg-Schwerin–United States relations
- Grand Duchy of Mecklenburg-Strelitz–United States relations
- Duchy of Nassau–United States relations
- North German Confederation–United States relations
- Grand Duchy of Oldenburg–United States relations
- Prussia–United States relations
- Principality of Schaumburg-Lippe–United States relations
- Kingdom of Württemberg–United States relations
