= Hanseatic Republics–United States relations =

Bremen–United States relations
- Bremen: United States

Lübeck–United States relations
- Lübeck: United States

Hamburg–United States relations
- Hamburg: United States

Relations between the Free Cities of Bremen, Lübeck, and Hamburg and the United States date back to 1790s when Hamburg became the first of the republics to recognized the U.S. on June 17, 1790. Bremen followed suit on March 28, 1794. Diplomatic relations were formally established in October 1853 when the U.S. received Rudolph Schleiden as Minister Resident of the Hanseatic Legation in Washington, D.C. Relations ended in 1868 as the republics joined North German Confederation.

== History ==
The first known act of recognition between the United States and Hamburg came in 1790 when the Free City of Hamburg accepted the credentials of U.S. Vice Consul John Parish, who was appointed to that position on June 17, 1790. Additionally, on February 19, 1793, the U.S. Congress resolved that John Parish was to be accredited as U.S. Consul in Hamburg.

The first known act of recognition between the United States and Bremen was in 1794 when Arnold Delius, who on May 28, 1794, was appointed as U.S. Consul at Bremen, arrived to open the first U.S. consulate in that city. The U.S. did not open a consulate in Lübeck until August 6, 1824.

The U.S. opened consulates starting in Bremen on May 29, 1794, known as the Consular Agency of the United States, Bremen, which closed in September 1985. A consulate in Bremerhaven on June 27, 1882, which closed on May 1, 1949. The Consulate General in Hamburg was opened on June 17, 1790. The U.S. Consulate in Lübeck opened on August 6, 1824, and closed on March 1, 1916. The U.S. Consulate to the Hanseatic and Free Cities opened on January 24, 1857, and closed on July 17, 1862.

The first time that the Hanseatic Republics were represented in the United States as a joint delegation came on December 4, 1827, when the U.S. received Hanseatic Republic Minister Plenipotentiary near the United States of America Vincent Rumpff. Rumpff was sent to the United States to negotiate and sign the first treaty between the United States and the three Hanseatic Republics.

Relations ended on September 25, 1868, when the Hanseatic Republic Acting Chargé d’Affaires A. Schumacker presented the letters of recall of Johannes Rosing, the Hanseatic Republic's Chargé d’Affaires. The withdrawal of the Hanseatic mission was due to the three Republics of Bremen, Hamburg, and Lübeck joining the North German Confederation.

=== Treaties ===
On December 20, 1827, the Convention of Friendship, Commerce, and Navigation was signed between the United States and the Hanseatic Republics, which facilitated commercial intercourse and navigational privileges. The Convention was signed by Secretary of State Henry Clay and the Hanseatic Republic Minister Plenipotentiary near the United States of America Vincent Rumpff. On June 7, 1828, an Additional Article to the Convention of 1827 was signed by the United States and the Hanseatic Republics, which conferred greater powers upon each other's consuls and vice-consuls.

On April 30, 1852, a Consular Convention was signed which further extended the jurisdiction of their respective Consuls. With this agreement, consuls and vice-consuls could act as judges and arbitrators to mediate differences between masters and crews of vessels of their respective nations.

On September 6, 1853, the Declaration of Accession of the Senate of the Free Hanseatic City of Bremen to the Convention for the Extradition of Criminals, Fugitives from Justice, between Prussia and Other States of the Germanic Confederation and the United States was signed.

On August 21, 1854, a convention was signed between the Republics and the U.S. "to secure and extend by an amicable convention the relations happily existing between two countries."

== See also ==
- Foreign relations of the United States
- Germany–United States relations
- Grand Duchy of Baden–United States relations
- Kingdom of Bavaria–United States relations
- Duchy of Brunswick-Lüneburg–United States relations
- Kingdom of Hanover–United States relations
- German Empire–United States relations
- Grand Duchy of Hesse–United States relations
- Grand Duchy of Mecklenburg-Schwerin–United States relations
- Grand Duchy of Mecklenburg-Strelitz–United States relations
- Duchy of Nassau–United States relations
- North German Confederation–United States relations
- Grand Duchy of Oldenburg–United States relations
- Prussia–United States relations
- Principality of Schaumburg-Lippe–United States relations
- Kingdom of Württemberg–United States relations
