= Bancroft Tower =

- U.S. National Register of Historic Places
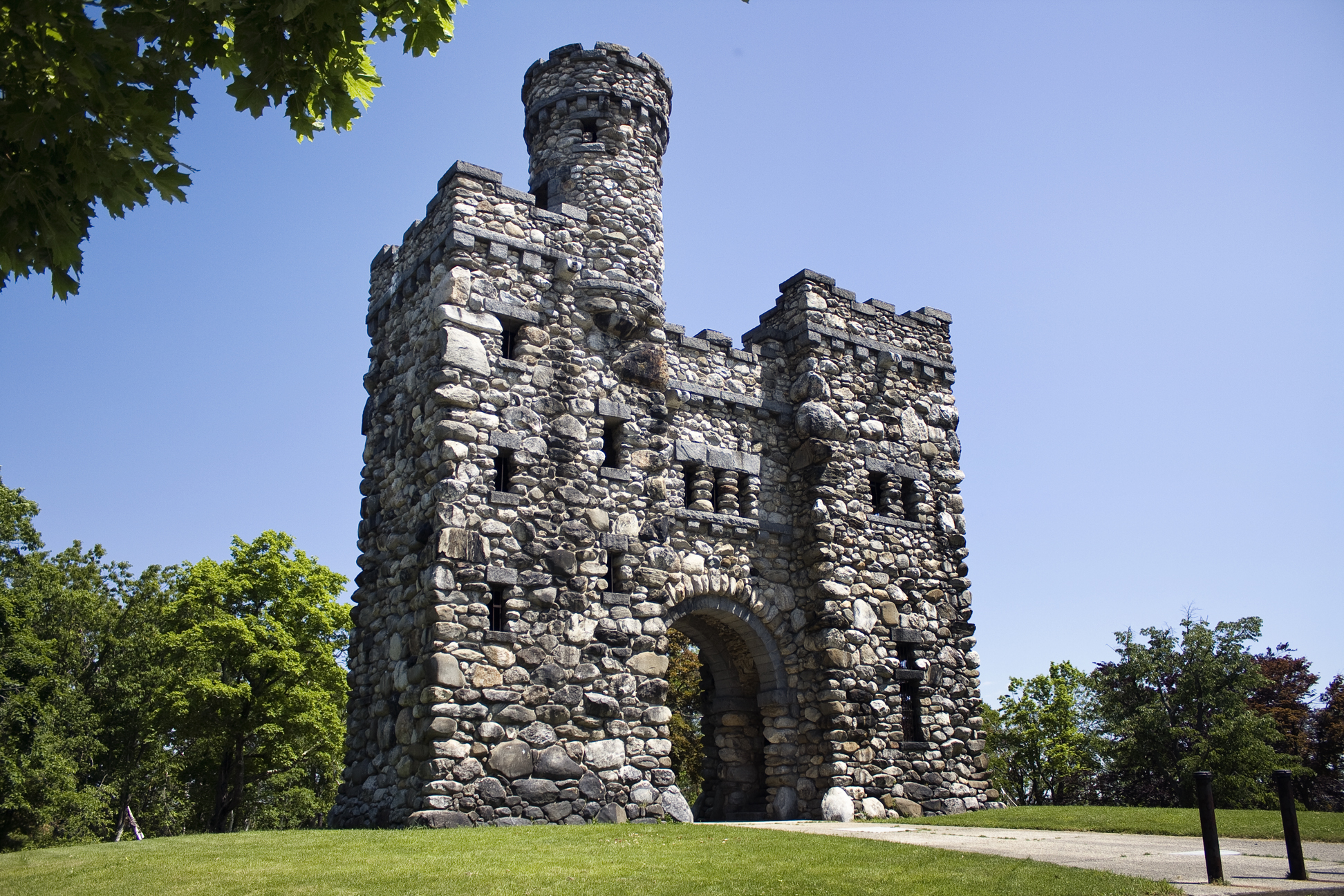
- Bancroft Tower

- Location within Massachusetts Location within the United States
- Location: Bancroft Tower Rd., Worcester, Massachusetts
- Coordinates: 42.2765°N 71.8158°W
- Area: 1 acre (0.40 ha)
- Built: 1900
- Architect: Earle & Fisher
- Architectural style: Romanesque
- MPS: Worcester MRA
- NRHP reference No.: 80000524
- Added to NRHP: March 5, 1980

Bancroft Tower is a 56-foot-high (17 m) tower of granite and natural stone, which looks like a miniature feudal castle. It is in Salisbury Park, in the city of Worcester, Massachusetts. The folly was erected in 1900, in memory of George Bancroft, a native of Worcester and a politician, historian, and statesman. The tower was designed by Worcester architects Earle and Fisher, and cost about $15,000 to build. Bancroft Tower is listed on the National Register of Historic Places.

== Description ==
Bancroft Tower stands northwest of downtown Worcester, in Salisbury Park, a public park west of Park Avenue and south of Drury Lane. It is a two-story stone structure, built of boulders and cobbles, with a rock-faced granite exterior. It is asymmetrical in plan, with crenelated square towers at the corners and a taller, off-center circular tower in between. To one side of that tower is an arched gate. It contains of a indoor lookout previously available to enter but now barricaded by Worcester Massachusetts.

== History ==
This tower was erected by Stephen Salisbury III in honor of George Bancroft, a prominent historian and statesman, who had been a childhood friend of Salisbury's father. It was one of three towers built on high points of the city, and is the only one to survive. The park and tower remained in Salisbury's ownership until his death in 1907. The tower was bequeathed to the Worcester Art Museum, which gave it to the Worcester Parks Department in 1912. The Bancroft tower was listed on the National Register of Historic Places on March 5, 1980.

== Plaque ==
A plaque set in the ground in front of it explains its purpose:

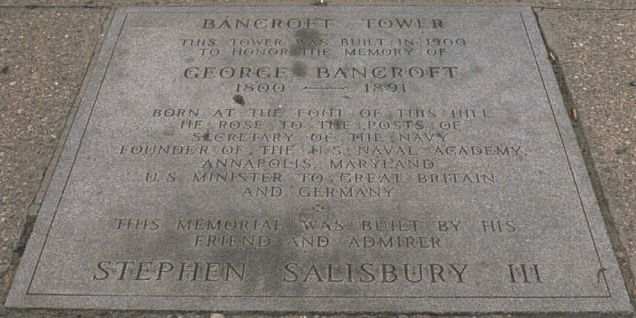
Plaque

BANCROFT TOWER
THIS TOWER WAS BUILT IN 1900
TO HONOR THE MEMORY OF

GEORGE BANCROFT
1800–1891

BORN AT THE FOOT OF THIS HILL
HE ROSE TO THE POSTS OF
SECRETARY OF THE NAVY
FOUNDER OF THE U.S. NAVAL ACADEMY
ANNAPOLIS, MARYLAND
U.S. MINISTER TO GREAT BRITAIN
AND GERMANY

THIS MEMORIAL WAS BUILT BY HIS
FRIEND AND ADMIRER
STEPHEN SALISBURY III

Two half-compasses are set in the ground before and behind the tower. They are marked as if they pointed to the other six of the Seven Hills of Worcester (Bancroft Hill being one of the seven); but it doesn't appear, from the top of the hill, that they really do.

== Gallery ==
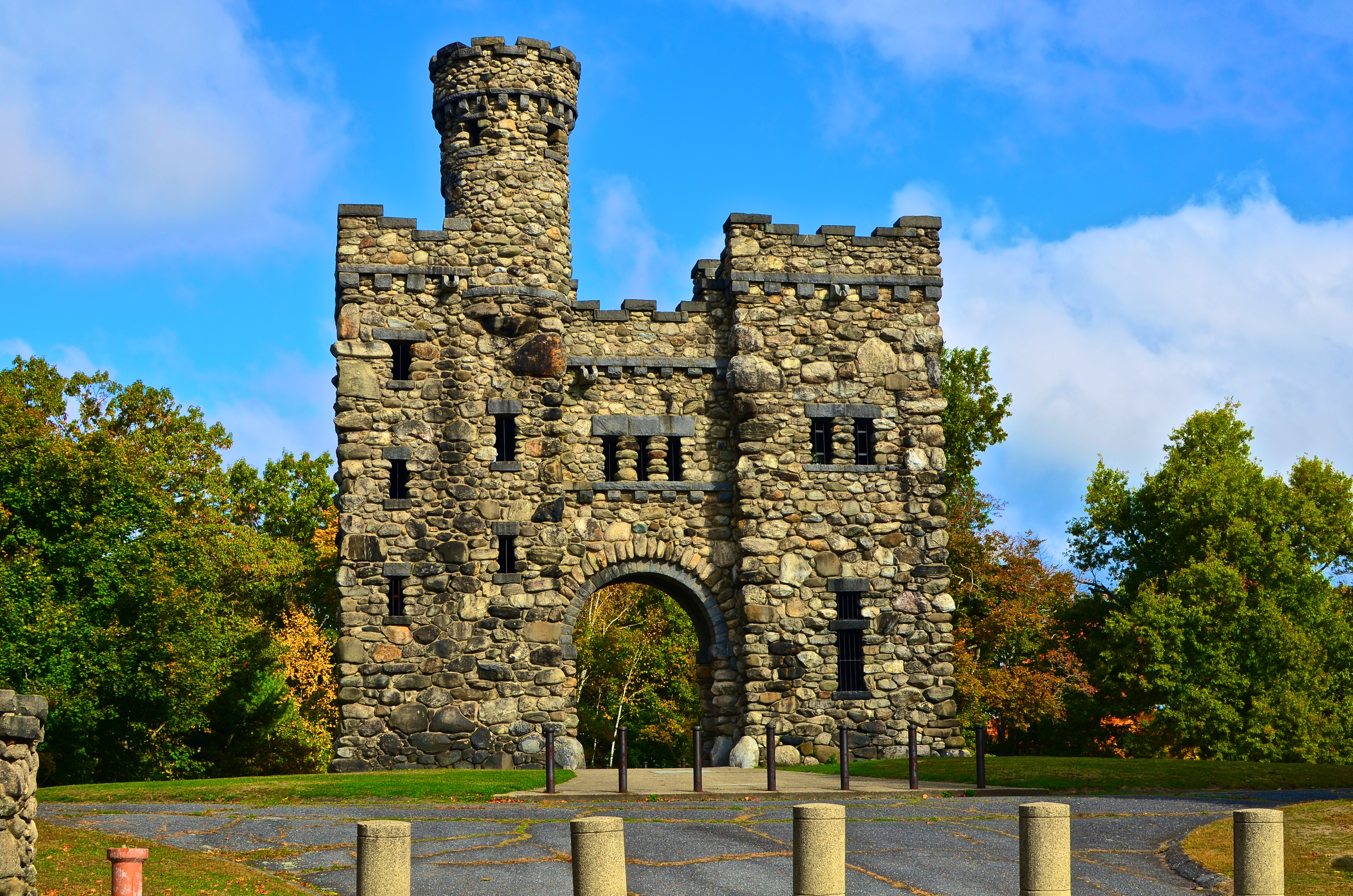
Bancroft Tower, October 13, 2013

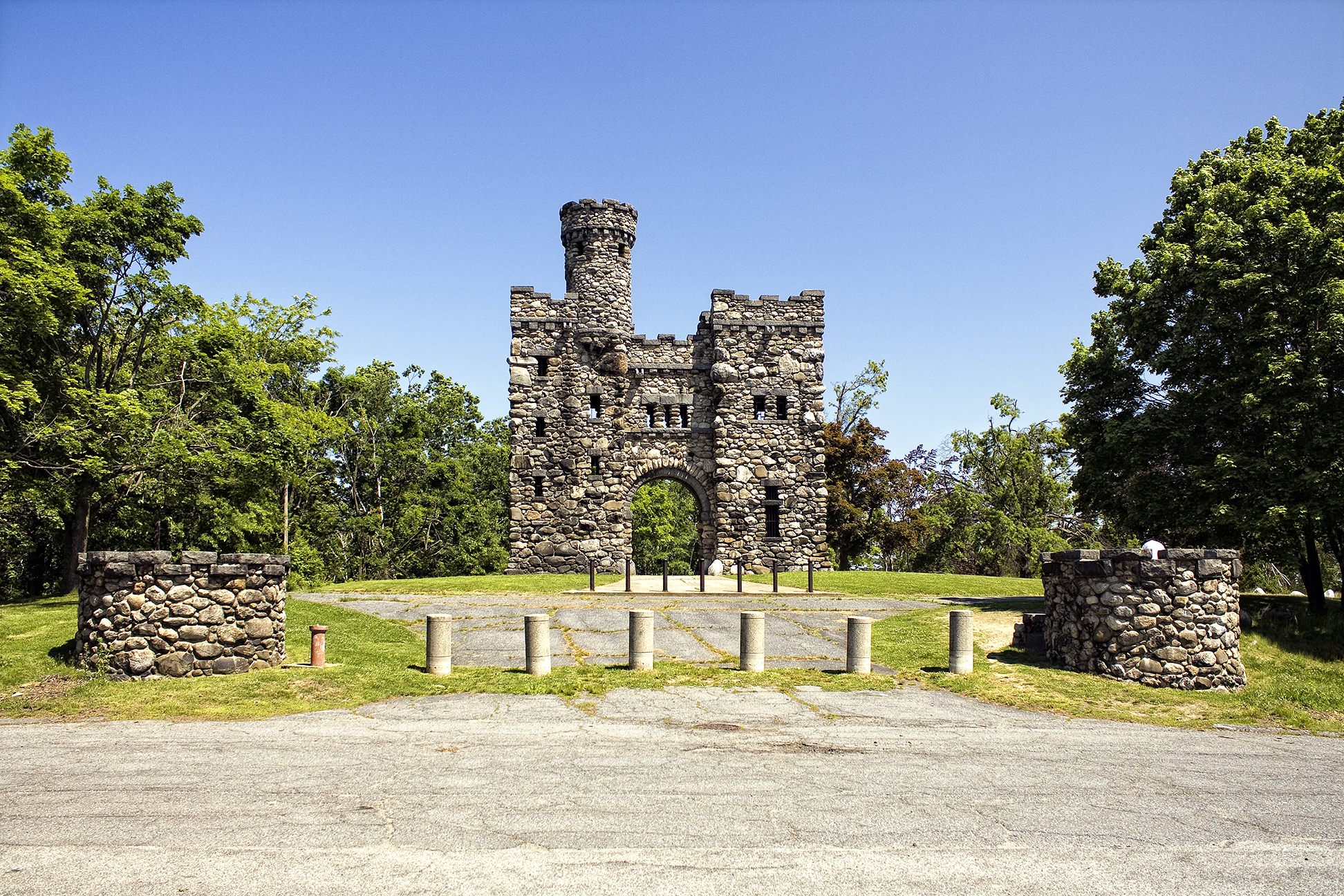
Bancroft Tower Park, 5/31/2009

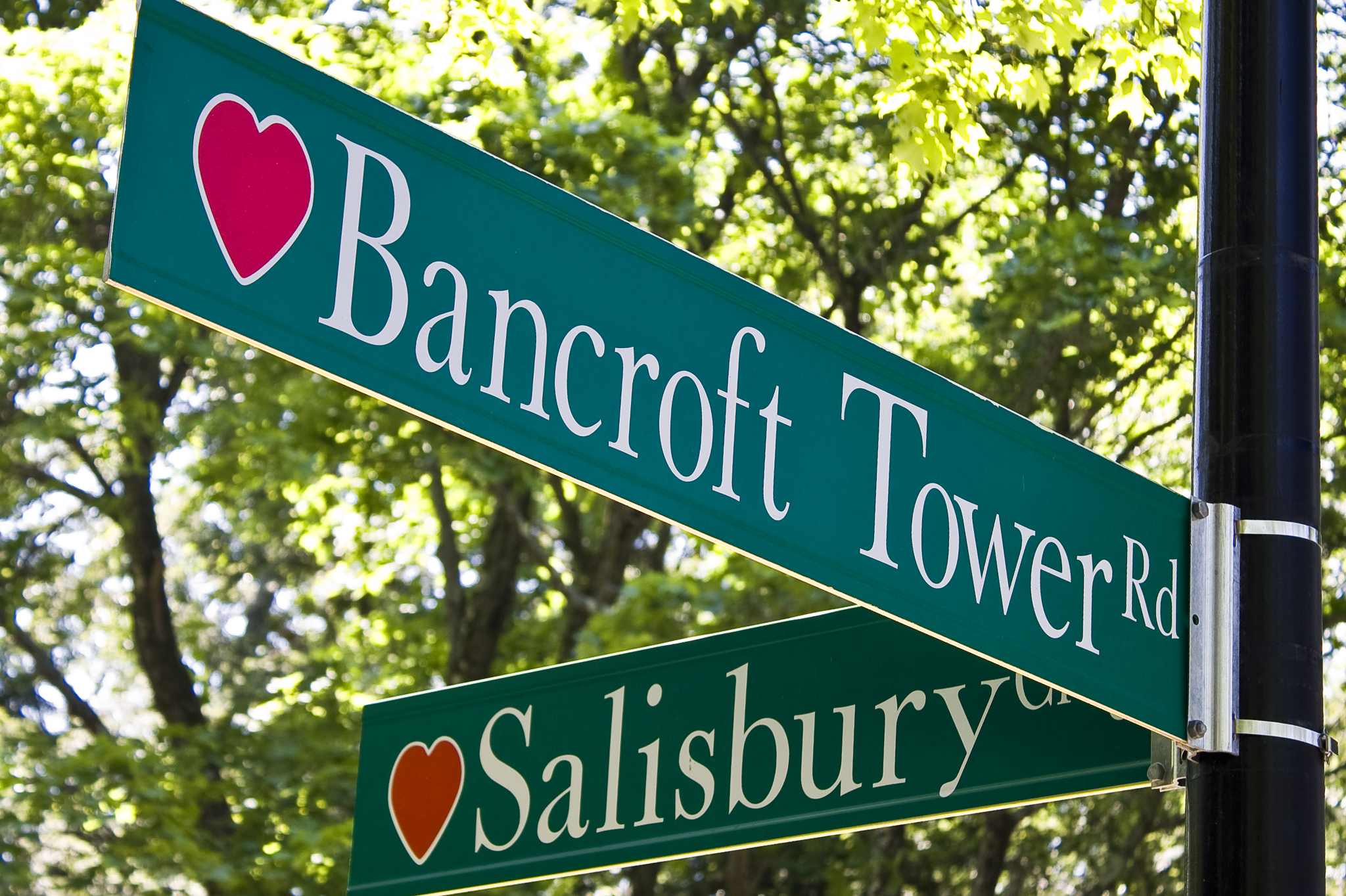
Bancroft Tower Rd, 5/31/2009

== See also ==
- National Register of Historic Places listings in northwestern Worcester, Massachusetts
- National Register of Historic Places listings in Worcester County, Massachusetts
- Folly
