= USCS Bancroft =

History

United States
- Name: Bancroft
- Namesake: George Bancroft (1800-1891), noted historian and statesman who as Secretary of the Navy (1845-1846) established the United States Naval Academy
- Acquired: 1846
- Commissioned: 1846
- Decommissioned: 1862

General characteristics
- Type: Survey ship (schooner)
- Length: 60 ft (18 m)
- Beam: 17.5 ft (5.3 m)
- Draft: 4.2 ft (1.3 m)
- Propulsion: Sails
- Sail plan: Schooner-rigged

USCS Bancroft was a schooner that served as a survey ship in the United States Coast Survey, a predecessor of the United States Coast and Geodetic Survey, from 1846 to 1862.

The Coast Survey purchased Bancroft in 1846 for $2,098.42 and placed her in service the same year. She operated along the United States East Coast during her career.

Bancroft was at Beaufort, South Carolina, on the night of 22 December 1855 when a fire broke out which threatened to destroy the town. The officers and crew of Bancroft promptly joined others in fighting and containing the fire, and her officers received the thanks of the citizens of Beaufort for Bancroft's quick response to the emergency.

Bancroft was retired in 1862.
