= United States declaration of war on Austria-Hungary =

December 1917 declaration of war during World War I

- Long title: Joint Resolution Declaring that a state of war exists between the Imperial and Royal Austro-Hungarian Government and the Government and the people of the United States, and making provision to prosecute the same.
- Nicknames: United States declaration of war on Austria-Hungary
- Enacted by: the 65th United States Congress
- Effective: December 7, 1917

Citations
- Statutes at Large: Sess. 2, ch. 1, 40 Stat. 429

Legislative history
- Introduced in the House by Henry D. Flood on December 4, 1917; Committee consideration by United States House Committee on Foreign Affairs; Passed the House of Representatives on December 7, 1917 (350-1); Passed the Senate on December 7, 1917 (74-0); Signed into law by President Woodrow Wilson on December 7, 1917

The 1917 United States declaration of war on Austria-Hungary, officially House Joint Resolution 169, was a resolution adopted by the United States Congress declaring that a state of war existed between the United States of America and the Austro-Hungarian Empire. It occurred eight months after the earlier declaration of war against Germany that had brought the United States into World War I. Enacted on December 7, 1917 and coming into effect the same day, it was officially terminated in 1921, three years after the effective capitulation of Austria-Hungary.

== Background ==
On April 6, 1917 the United States declared war against Germany. The declaration of war was enacted at the request of US President Woodrow Wilson by a vote of both chambers of the US Congress, with the US House of Representatives voting 373 to 50 (nine not voting) in favor of war and the US Senate voting 82 to six. In his speech to Congress requesting for war to be declared against Germany, Wilson addressed the question of Austria-Hungary, an ally of Germany:

that government [Austria-Hungary] has not actually engaged in warfare against citizens of the United States on the seas, and I take the liberty, for the present at least, of postponing a discussion of our relations with the government in Vienna.

Two days later, Austria-Hungary terminated diplomatic relations with the United States and requested, in a diplomatic note that was delivered to the chargé d'affaires of the US embassy in Vienna, for American diplomats to depart the country.

== Declaration of war ==
=== Request ===
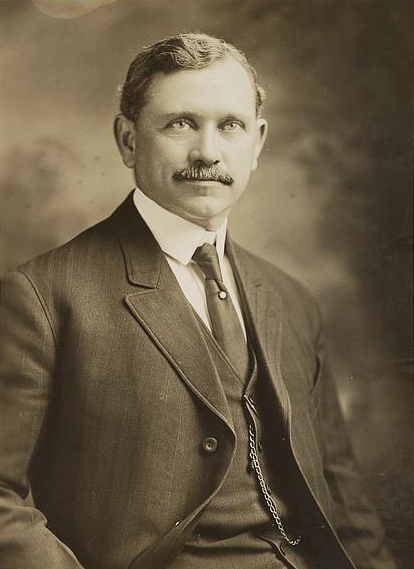
Virginia congressman Henry D. Flood introduced the declaration of war.

On December 4, 1917, Wilson appeared before Congress to deliver the 1917 State of the Union Address. In it, he requested a declaration of war against Austria-Hungary and stated such a declaration to be necessary to "clear away with a thorough hand all impediments to success." Wilson went on to charge that Austria-Hungary was "the vassal of the German government" and was acting as the "instrument of another nation." However, Wilson's real impetus for seeking a declaration of war against was the situation in Italy. American military planners believed that it might soon be necessary to deploy American forces to shore up Italian defenses against robust Austrian gains.

In response to Wilson's address, Henry D. Flood introduced House Joint Resolution 169, a declaration of war, which was referred to the House Committee on Foreign Affairs for consideration. The committee issued a report stating that the "state of war which this declaration declares to exist actually has been a fact for many months" and unanimously recommended adoption of the resolution. The report went on to charge that in September 1915, Konstantin Dumba, the Austro-Hungarian ambassador to the United States, had masterminded a scheme of industrial sabotage aimed at American manufacturing and that on April 4, 1917 the crew of an unflagged submarine boarded and then sank the American schooner SV Marguerite in the Mediterranean and that the nationality of the submarine was suspected Austrian since "Austrian was the language spoken by the officer of the submarine [sic]." The report was incorrect; the Marguerite had actually been sunk by the German submarine U-35.

=== Enactment ===
On December 7 House Joint Resolution 169 was adopted by the House of Representatives in a vote of 365-1, and by the Senate in a vote of 74-0. The president signed the declaration later that day.

==== Debate ====
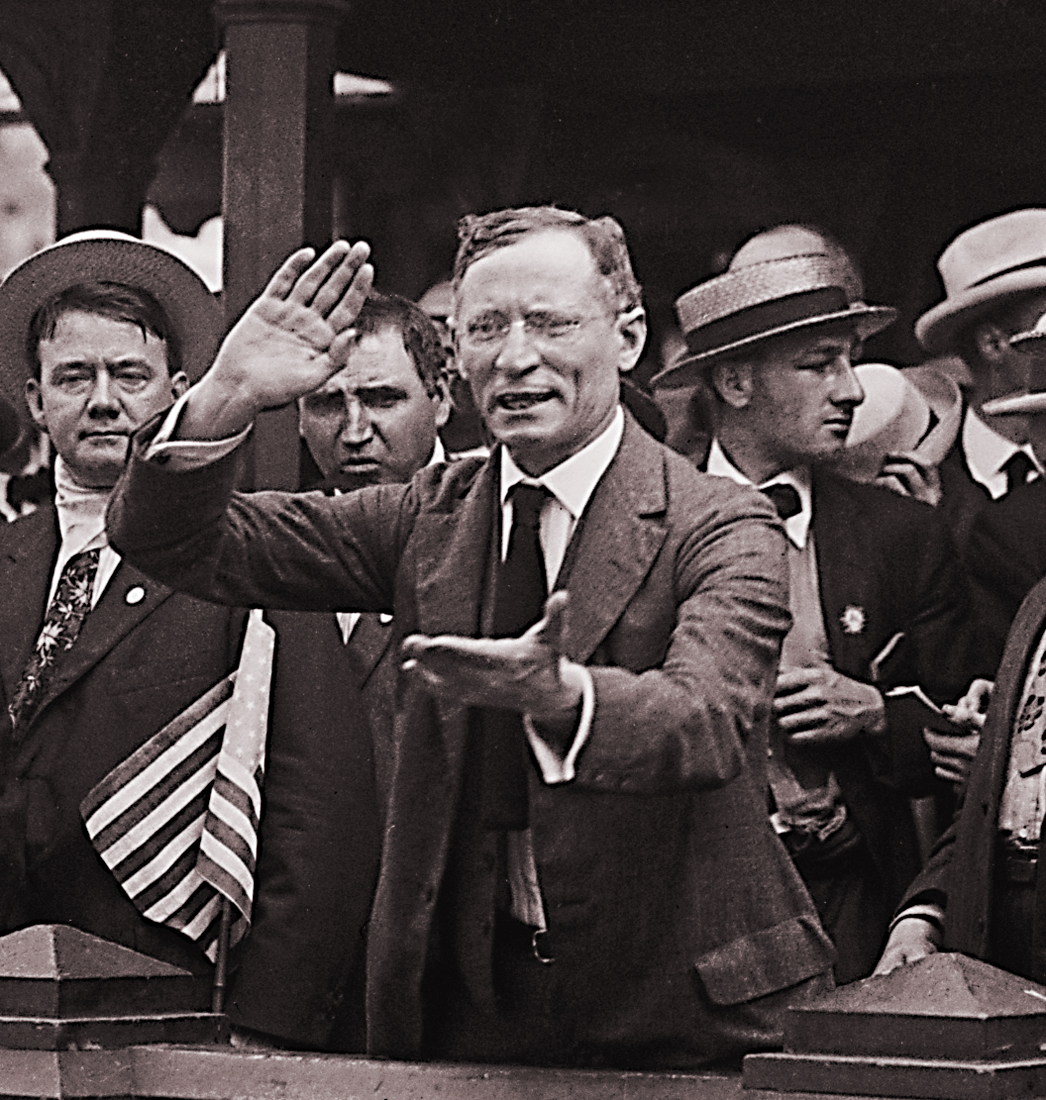
Meyer London, pictured here in 1916, was the sole vote against the declaration of war against Austria-Hungary.

Jeannette Rankin, who had earlier voted against the declaration of war against Germany, voted in favor of the declaration of war against Austria-Hungary, stating that "the vote we are now to cast is not a vote on a declaration of war. If it were, I should vote against it. This is a vote on a mere technicality in the prosecution of a war already declared."

The sole vote of opposition in the House came from Meyer London, a Socialist representative from New York, who had earlier cast the only Northeastern vote against declaring war with Germany. On the floor of the House, London declared that he hated "professions of loyalty" but that he believed "I am as deeply in love with the United States as any man who can trace his ancestry to the Mayflower." However, London said that his constituents opposed war and that he preferred the United States to adopt an arms embargo against Europe, the same rationale that he had given for opposing the declaration of war against Germany. He was roundly denounced on the floor of the House.

In the Senate, Robert M. La Follette did not vote on the resolution since he had departed the chamber to return to his office and to prepare an amendment to the declaration that would guarantee that the United States would not participate in the postwar dismemberment of Austria. While La Follette was out of the chamber, the vote was called. La Follette later said that he would have voted against the resolution in the form that it was passed.

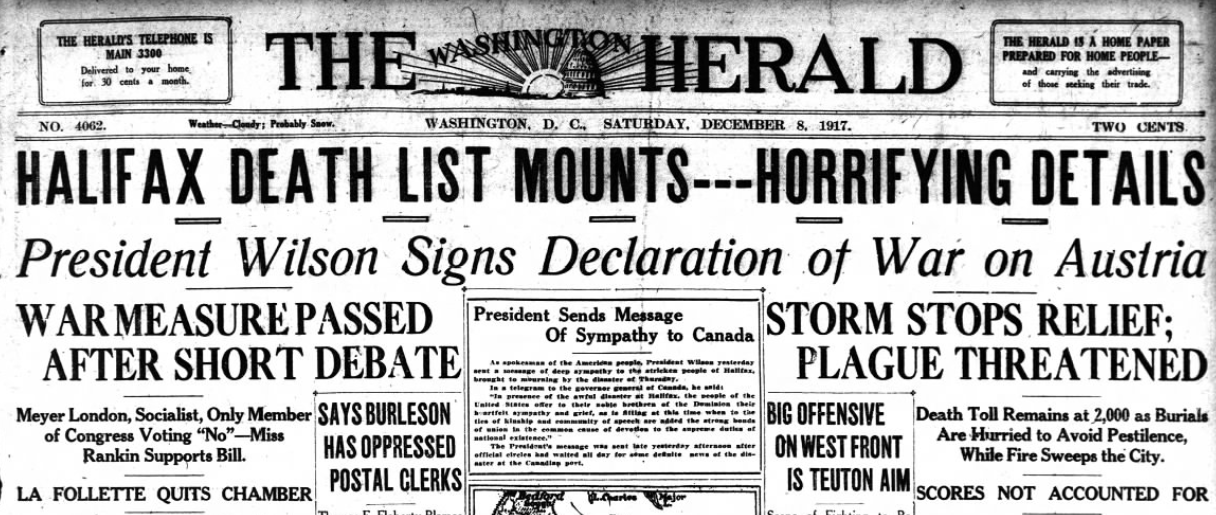
The front page of the December 8, 1917 issue of the Washington Herald; news of the war declaration was overshadowed by the devastating Halifax Explosion, the third-largest non-nuclear explosion in history.

=== Text of declaration ===
Whereas the Imperial and Royal Austro-Hungarian Government has committed repeated acts of war against the Government and the people of the United States of America : Therefore be it Resolved by the Senate and House of Representatives of the United States of America in Congress assembled, That a state of war is hereby declared to exist between the United States of America and the Imperial and Royal Austro-Hungarian Government; and that the President be, and he is hereby, authorized and directed to employ the entire naval and military forces of the United States and the resources of the Government to carry on war against the Imperial and Royal Austro-Hungarian Government; and to bring the conflict to a successful termination all the resources of the country are hereby pledged by the Congress of the United States.

== International reactions ==
- Austria-Hungary: the Austro-Hungarian foreign minister, Count Ottokar Czernin, remarked that the declaration of war "will be bad for Austro-Hungarians in America, but will not influence the results of the war."
- Italy: in Italy, the newspaper Corriere della Sera, in a staff editorial, stated, "Austria-Hungary has today a powerful enemy, and this enemy is for us a friend whose friendship must serve in war and peace "
- Soviet Russia: in the Russian Soviet Federative Socialist Republic, the official Army Journal, in a staff editorial, declared, "Peace by means of war. This is the mark under which the American imperialists are posing. America declares herself the implacable enemy of Austria-Hungary without any evident reason, without any justifying motives save covetousness and greed. American capitalists talking with hypocrisy about the horrors of war are striving to lengthen the bloody terror."

== Aftermath ==
In autumn 1918, the imperial government collapsed, and on October 18, Stephan Burián von Rajecz, acting on behalf of the remnants of the state organs, sued for peace. The US Senate declined to ratify the Treaty of Saint-Germain-en-Laye and the Treaty of Trianon, which established peace between the Allied powers and Austria-Hungary and resulted in the formal dissolution of the Austro-Hungarian Empire. As a result, the state of war between the United States and a nonexistent Austria-Hungary continued, albeit without active hostilities, until it was officially terminated by the U.S.–Austrian Peace Treaty (1921) and the U.S.–Hungarian Peace Treaty (1921), which were signed by Austria-Hungary's successor states: Austria and Hungary.

== See also ==
- American entry into World War I
- Declarations of war during World War I
