= Aaron Bancroft =

American clergyman (1755–1839)

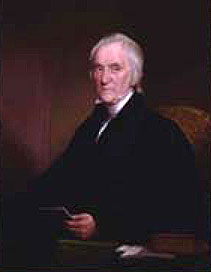
- portrait by Alvan Fisher
- Born: November 10, 1755; Reading, Province of Massachusetts, US
- Died: August 19, 1839 (aged 83); Worcester, Massachusetts, US
- Children: George Bancroft (son)
- Parents: Samuel Bancroft (father); Lydia Parker (mother)

Ecclesiastical career
- Church: Congregational church, Worcester, Massachusetts
- Writings: Biography of George Washington in 1807 - 1908
- Congregations: Congregational church, Worcester, Massachusetts

Aaron Bancroft (November 10, 1755 – August 19, 1839) was an American clergyman. He was born in Reading, Massachusetts to Samuel Bancroft and Lydia Parker.

== Biography ==
He began his studies during the American Revolution, and served as a minuteman. He was present at the battles of both Lexington and Bunker Hill. He graduated from Harvard in 1778 and subsequently taught, studied theology and spent three years as a missionary in Yarmouth, Nova Scotia. In 1785, he settled in Worcester, Massachusetts as pastor of the Congregational church and remained in the same post until his death in 1839. During the middle of his life, his theological views leaned toward Arminianism and by his advocacy of liberalism, he became a noted leader in the early period of the Unitarian schism. He published a eulogy of George Washington in 1800 and wrote a subsequent biography of Washington in 1807. He was elected a Fellow of the American Academy of Arts and Sciences in 1805, and was a founding member of the American Antiquarian Society in 1812, for which he served as vice-president from 1816 to 1831. Although president of the American Unitarian Association, he adhered to the name and system of Congregationalism until his death in Worcester, Massachusetts.

His son was George Bancroft, American historian, United States Secretary of the Navy and United States Ambassador to the United Kingdom.

== Works ==
- Bancroft, Aaron. Life of George Washington Commander in Chief of the American Army Through the Revolutionary War, and the First President of the United States. London: Printed for J. Stockdale, 1808.
