= Declarations of war during World War I =

A declaration of war is a formal act by which one nation goes to war against another. A declaration is usually an act of delivering a performative speech (not to be confused with a mere speech) or the presentation of a signed document by an authorized party of a national government in order to create a state of war between two or more sovereign states. In the context of World War I, the official international protocol for declaring war was defined in the Hague Convention of 1907 (or Hague II). For the diplomatic maneuvering behind these events, which led to hostilities between nations, see Diplomatic history of World War I.

== List of war declarations ==
Below is a table showing the outbreaks of wars between nations which occurred during World War I. Indicated are the dates (during the immediate build-up to, or during the course of, World War I) from which a de facto state of war existed between nations. The table shows both the initiator states and the state at which the declaration of war was aimed. Events listed include those in which there were a simple diplomatic breaking of relations that did not involve any physical attack, as well as those involving overt declarations or acts of aggression.

Date	Initiator states	Targeted states
July 28, 1914	Austria-Hungary	Serbia
August 1, 1914	German Empire	Russian Empire
August 3, 1914	German Empire	France
August 4, 1914	German Empire	Belgium
August 4, 1914	British Empire	German Empire
August 5, 1914	Montenegro	Austria-Hungary
August 6, 1914	Austria-Hungary	Russian Empire
August 6, 1914	Serbia	German Empire
August 8, 1914	Montenegro	German Empire
August 12, 1914	British Empire	Austria-Hungary
August 12, 1914	France	Austria-Hungary
August 23, 1914	Japan	German Empire
August 25, 1914	Japan	Austria-Hungary
August 28, 1914	Austria-Hungary	Belgium
November 1, 1914	Russian Empire	Ottoman Empire
November 5, 1914	France	Ottoman Empire
November 5, 1914	British Empire	Ottoman Empire
November 11, 1914	Ottoman Empire	British Empire
November 11, 1914	Ottoman Empire	France
November 11, 1914	Ottoman Empire	Russian Empire
December 2, 1914	Serbia	Ottoman Empire
December 3, 1914	Montenegro	Ottoman Empire
May 24, 1915	Italy	Austria-Hungary
August 21, 1915	Italy	Ottoman Empire
October 14, 1915	Bulgaria	Serbia
October 15, 1915	British Empire	Bulgaria
October 15, 1915	Montenegro	Bulgaria
October 16, 1915	Japan	Bulgaria
October 16, 1915	France	Bulgaria
October 19, 1915	Italy	Bulgaria
October 19, 1915	Russian Empire	Bulgaria
March 9, 1916	German Empire	Portugal
March 15, 1916	Austria-Hungary	Portugal
August 27, 1916	Italy	German Empire
August 28, 1916	Romania	Austria-Hungary
August 28, 1916	German Empire	Romania
August 30, 1916	Ottoman Empire	Romania
September 1, 1916	Bulgaria	Romania
April 6, 1917	United States	German Empire
April 7, 1917	Panama	German Empire
April 7, 1917	Cuba	German Empire
June 27, 1917	Greece	Austria-Hungary
June 27, 1917	Greece	German Empire
June 27, 1917	Greece	Bulgaria
June 27, 1917	Greece	Ottoman Empire
July 22, 1917	Siam	Austria-Hungary
July 22, 1917	Siam	German Empire
August 4, 1917	Liberia	German Empire
August 14, 1917	China	Austria-Hungary
August 14, 1917	China	German Empire
October 26, 1917	Brazil	German Empire
December 7, 1917	United States	Austria-Hungary
December 10, 1917	Panama	Austria-Hungary
April 23, 1918	Guatemala	German Empire
May 6, 1918	Nicaragua	Austria-Hungary
May 6, 1918	Nicaragua	German Empire
May 23, 1918	Costa Rica	German Empire
July 12, 1918	Haiti	German Empire
July 19, 1918	Honduras	German Empire

== See also ==
- British declaration of war upon Germany (1914)
- United States declaration of war on Germany (1917)
- United States declaration of war on Austria-Hungary
- Declarations of war during World War II
