= Duchy of Nassau–United States relations =

- Duchy of Nassau: United States

The Duchy of Nassau and the United States' mutual recognition occurred in 1846 when the two states signed a convention to abolish emigration taxes. During the Austro-Prussian War, the Duchy of Nassau fought on the side of Austria. On the losing side, the Duchy of Nassau was annexed to Prussia on October 3, 1866, ceased to be an independent sovereign state ending relations.

== History ==
On May 27, 1846, the signing of a Convention for the Mutual Abolition of the Droit d’Aubaine and Taxes on Emigration began mutual recognition between both countries. This convention was concluded in Berlin between U.S. Minister to Prussia Henry Wheaton and Nassau’s Minister to Prussia Col. and Chamberlain Otto Wilhelm Carl von Roeder.

The first U.S. Consul appointed to the Duchy of Nassau was John B. Muller Melchiors on November 1, 1853.

In 1866 relations ended after the Austro-Prussian War which resulted in Austria's defeat and Nassau was annexed by Prussia on October 3 ending the existence of the duchy.

== See also ==
- Foreign relations of the United States
- Germany–United States relations
- Grand Duchy of Baden–United States relations
- Kingdom of Bavaria–United States relations
- Duchy of Brunswick-Lüneburg–United States relations
- Kingdom of Hanover–United States relations
- German Empire–United States relations
- Hanseatic Republics–United States relations
- Grand Duchy of Hesse–United States relations
- Grand Duchy of Mecklenburg-Schwerin–United States relations
- Grand Duchy of Mecklenburg-Strelitz–United States relations
- North German Confederation–United States relations
- Grand Duchy of Oldenburg–United States relations
- Prussia–United States relations
- Principality of Schaumburg-Lippe–United States relations
- Kingdom of Württemberg–United States relations
