= Kingdom of Hanover–United States relations =

- Hanover: United States

The Kingdom of Hanover and the United States began relations with mutual recognition in 1830 but never formulated diplomatic ties. All ties came to an abrupt halt when Hanover was defeated during the Austro-Prussian War of 1866 and subsequently merged directly into the Kingdom of Prussia. From this point, Hanover had relations with the United States as a part of the Kingdom of Prussia.

== History ==
When the United States announced its independence from Great Britain in 1776, Hanover was a sovereign, independent state. Previously an Electorate, the Kingdom of Hanover was re-established in 1814 after the Napoleonic Wars. At the time, the King of Hanover was George III of Britain. From 1814 until 1837 the King of Hanover was the same man as the King of Britain (George III, George IV, and William IV). As Hanover (and most of the German States) observed Salic law and Great Britain did not, the passing of King William in 1837 meant that the Hanovarian crown descended through the male bloodline to Ernest Augustus of Hanover, while the British crown went to Queen Victoria.

The first known act of mutual recognition between the Kingdom of Hanover and the United States occurred on January 8, 1830, when Secretary of State Martin Van Buren granted an exequatur to Theodore Meyer Esq. to serve as Consul for the Kingdom of Hanover in New York City. Despite the fact that the Kings of Hanover, acting as Kings of Britain, had recognized the United States in 1783 with the signing of the peace treaty that ended the war between Britain and the United States, the U.S. never officially established diplomatic relations with the Kingdom of Hanover.

On May 20, 1840, U.S. Minister to Prussia Henry Wheaton and Hanovarian Minister to Prussia Le Sieur Auguste de Berger negotiated and signed a Treaty of Commerce and Navigation between the United States and the Kingdom of Hanover, establishing the rules and regulations of trade and commerce between the two states.

On June 10, 1846, both countries signed another Treaty of Commerce and Navigation that settled in a more definitive manner the rules to be observed by the original Treaty of Commerce and Navigation of 1840. This treaty was terminated when Hanover was forced to merge into Prussia in 1866.

On January 18, 1855, U.S. Minister to Great Britain James Buchanan, and Hanovarian Minister to Britain Count Adolphus von Kielmansegge negotiated an Extradition Treaty between their two states. The treaty was signed in London and was terminated eleven years later when Hanover merged into Prussia after the Austro-Prussian War of 1866.

On November 6, 1861, the United States and the Kingdom of Hanover signed the Convention Abolishing Stade or Brunshausen Dues. The treaty was negotiated and signed by U.S. Minister to Prussia Norman B. Judd and Hanovarian Minister to Prussia Lt. Col. And Extrarodinary Aid-de-Camp August Wilhelm von Reitzenstein. It abolished the toll previously levied "on cargoes of American vessels ascending the Elbe, and passing the mouth of the river called Schwinge, designated under the name of the Stade or Brunshausen dues."

After Hanover was defeated in the Austro-Prussian War of 1866 it was subsequently merged directly into Prussia. From this point, Hanover had relations with the United States as a part of the Kingdom of Prussia. Thus, all relations between Hanover and the United States ended and continued under the Prussian Kingdom.

== See also ==
- Foreign relations of the United States
- Germany–United States relations
- Grand Duchy of Baden–United States relations
- Kingdom of Bavaria–United States relations
- Duchy of Brunswick-Lüneburg–United States relations
- German Empire–United States relations
- Hanseatic Republics–United States relations
- Grand Duchy of Hesse–United States relations
- Grand Duchy of Mecklenburg-Schwerin–United States relations
- Grand Duchy of Mecklenburg-Strelitz–United States relations
- Duchy of Nassau–United States relations
- North German Confederation–United States relations
- Grand Duchy of Oldenburg–United States relations
- Prussia–United States relations
- Principality of Schaumburg-Lippe–United States relations
- Kingdom of Württemberg–United States relations
