= British declaration of war upon Germany (1914) =

World War I conflict

The United Kingdom issued a declaration of war upon the German Empire on 4 August 1914. The declaration was a result of German refusal to remove troops from neutral Belgium. In 1839, the United Kingdom, France, and Prussia (the largest predecessor of the German Empire) had signed the Treaty of London which guaranteed Belgium's sovereignty.

However, the actual reasoning had at least as much to do with the British fright that lack of their help leading to a possible defeat of France could lead to German hegemony in Western Europe, with Christopher Clark pointing out that the British cabinet decided, on 29 July 1914, that being a signatory to the 1839 treaty guaranteeing Belgium's frontiers did not oblige it to oppose a German invasion of Belgium with military force. According to Isabel V. Hull:

Annika Mombauer correctly sums up the current historiography: "Few historians would still maintain that the 'rape of Belgium' was the real motive for Britain's declaration of war on Germany." Instead, the role of Belgian neutrality is variously interpreted as an excuse used to mobilise public opinion, to provide embarrassed radicals in the cabinet with the justification for abandoning the principal of pacifism and thus staying in office, or - in the more conspiratorial versions - as cover for naked imperial interests.

At the time, the British government in London was responsible for the foreign affairs not only of the British colonies and protectorates but also of the five Dominions, so its declaration of war was made on behalf of the whole British Empire.

== Order of events ==
On 3 August 1914, Sir Edward Grey, the Foreign Secretary, announced to the House of Commons information he had received from the Belgian Legation in London. He said that Belgian officials had informed him that they had received a notice from Germany proposing to Belgium friendly neutrality, covering free passage on Belgian territory, and promising maintenance of independence of the kingdom and possessions at the conclusion of peace, and threatening, in case of refusal, to treat Belgium as an enemy. A time limit of twelve hours was fixed for the reply. Grey then informed the House Belgium had informed him they would enter into no agreement with Germany.

On 4 August 1914, H. H. Asquith, the Prime Minister, made the following statement in the House of Commons:

The King of the Belgians has made an appeal to His Majesty the King for diplomatic intervention on behalf of Belgium. His Majesty's Government are also informed that the German Government has delivered to the Belgian Government a Note proposing friendly neutrality entailing free passage through Belgian territory and promising to maintain the independence and integrity of the Kingdom and its possessions, at the conclusion of peace, threatening in case of refusal to treat Belgium as an enemy. An answer was requested within twelve hours. We also understand that Belgium has categorically refused this as a flagrant violation of the law of nations. His Majesty's Government are bound to protest against this violation of a Treaty to which Germany is a party in common with themselves, and must request an assurance that the demand made upon Belgium may not be proceeded with, and that her neutrality will be respected by Germany. You should ask for an immediate reply.

On 5 August 1914, Asquith told the House of Commons:

Our Ambassador at Berlin received his passports at seven o'clock last evening, and since eleven o'clock last night a state of war has existed between Germany and ourselves. We have received from our Minister at Brussels the following telegram: "I have just received from Minister for Foreign Affairs—" that is the Belgian Minister for Foreign Affairs— "a note of which the following is a literal translation: 'Belgian Government regret to have to inform His Majesty's Government that this morning armed forces of Germany penetrated into Belgian territory in violation of engagements assumed by treaty.'"

During the same meeting, the House of Commons voted to approve a credit of £100,000,000 (£1.24×10^{10} in 2024) for the war effort.

That same day, The London Gazette published a special supplement containing two documents dated the previous day (4 August). The first was issued by the Foreign Office:

A STATE OF WAR

His Majesty's Government informed the German Government on August 4th, 1914, that, unless a satisfactory reply to the request of His Majesty's Government for an assurance that Germany would respect the neutrality of Belgium was received by midnight of that day, His Majesty's Government would feel bound to take all steps in their power to uphold that neutrality and the observance of a treaty to which Germany was as much a party as Great Britain.

The result of this communication having been that His Majesty's Ambassador at Berlin had to ask for his passports, His Majesty's Government have accordingly formally notified the German Government that a state of war exists between the two countries as from 11 p.m. to-day.

Foreign Office,

August 4th, 1914

The second was an Order in Council issued in the name of King George V dealing with the status of merchant shipping under the 1907 Hague Convention. It began:

His Majesty being mindful, now that a state of war exists between this Country and Germany, ...

Winston Churchill later wrote:

It was 11 o'clock at night – 12 by German time – when the ultimatum expired. The windows of the Admiralty were thrown wide open in the warm night air. Under the roof from which Nelson had received his orders were gathered a small group of admirals and captains and a cluster of clerks, pencil in hand, waiting. Along the Mall from the direction of the Palace the sound of an immense concourse singing "God Save the King" floated in. On this deep wave there broke the chimes of Big Ben; and, as the first stroke of the hour boomed out, a rustle of movement swept across the room. The war telegram, which meant "Commence hostilities against Germany," was flashed to the ships and establishments under the White Ensign all over the world.

I walked across the Horse Guards Parade to the Cabinet room and reported to the Prime Minister and the Ministers who were assembled there that the deed was done.

— Winston Churchill

On the morning of 5 August, Lewis Harcourt, Secretary of State for the Colonies, chaired a sub-committee of the Committee of Imperial Defence which recommended the Cabinet to send expeditions to capture most of the German overseas colonies: German East Africa, German South West Africa, Togoland, and Kamerun; and to invite Australia to seize German New Guinea and Yap, and for New Zealand to send an expedition to capture Samoa, and Nauru.

== See also ==
- Declarations of war by Great Britain and the United Kingdom
- Declarations of war during World War I
- British declaration of war on Germany (1939)
