= Aubain =

Feudal right allowing lords or monarchs to inherit an outsider's property upon death

The droit d'aubaine was a feudal right stipulating that a lord or monarch inherited the property of someone considered to be an outsider, or in French: aubain, upon their death, as if they lived under servile conditions.

According to historian Peter Sahlins, this right was adopted under the Ancien Régime by European sovereigns, particularly in France.

The aubains were distinguished from régnicoles, that is, subjects of the Crown who were born and resided in the kingdom.

According to the Dictionnaire de droit by Claude-Joseph de Ferrière in its 1749 edition, an aubain, meaning a foreigner, is someone born in another kingdom, so quasi alibi natus (as if born elsewhere). Foreigners paid no tribute to the king to reside there, however they were not able to avail themselves of civil rights, and were subject to the droit d'aubaine unless they had obtained letters of naturalization from the king. But they were still covered by the Law of Nations, also known as jus gentium. They could therefore engage in activities and contracts between living persons, as well as make and accept gifts between living persons. They had the ability to acquire and possess real estate and dispose of it during their lifetime. However, they could not bequeath goods or property upon death, nor make valid wills, nor ensure arrangements made as part of any final wishes before death.

There were other implications of droit d'aubaine. Such foreigners could not take on religious benefices, or hold public office, and had to pay a bond before trials, restrictions which would not necessarily apply to those considered to be régnicole. They were also liable to bodily restraint from the king's officers.

The differences, and the reason for them, were that contracts between living persons fall under the Law of Nations, which is common to all residents, without distinguishing whether they are the king's subjects or foreigners; whereas wills and final wishes depend entirely on civil law, in which the king's subjects participate, and from which foreigners are excluded. Foreigners had no heirs ab intestat (so as if without a will), because while they lived as free individuals, effectively they died as slaves. Thus, any property left behind upon death belonged to the king. An exception was made when a foreigner who died in France left behind legitimate régnicole children, born through marriage to a régnicole, who could potentially inherit from their aubain parent, instead of the treasury. The estate of aubains belonged to the king, rather than to any local lord or seigneur, notwithstanding any contrary customs.

== Seigneurial aubaine ==
However, there was also a seigneurial droit d'aubaine in certain places. It consisted of the fact that a person foreign to a lordship who settled there was considered to be of servile condition, known as mainmorte, if they had not declared their bourgeois status, and upon their death, the property of their estate was acquired by the lord. This right persisted in the few regions where real serfdom or mainmorte had not been completely abolished.

== Casual right ==
This casual right posed a significant risk for foreign merchants attending fairs, entrepreneurs and workers attracted to manufactories, mercenary soldiers, foreigners holding annuities or loan securities, and cities with large foreign populations. To secure their situation while ensuring revenue for the state, the droit d'aubaine was transformed into a specific tax on foreigners: in exchange for a 5% tax on the value of the deceased's property, the king waived the droit d'aubaine for nationals of Geneva (1608), Holland (1685), England (1739), Denmark (1742), Naples, Spain and other possessions of the European Bourbons (1762), the Grand Duchy of Tuscany (1768), and the Duchy of Parma (1769).

== Impact and abolition ==
The implications of droit d'aubaine was not always clear cut. While foreign residents were in theory at risk of restraint from the king's officers or agents, this was not always a realistic threat. Equally there would be examples of régnicoles who would have faced arbitrary treatment. In practice at least some aubains were able to use diplomacy, or their skills, to skirt around the restrictions that were theoretically in place. Over time, and before the French Revolution, the modern concepts of citizenship and nationality, based more on legal rather than political definitions, became more established in France towards the end of the 17th-century.

The droit d'aubaine was abolished by the National Constituent Assembly during the Revolution. Reinstated in the draft of the Civil Code of 1803, it was definitively abolished in 1819 under the Restoration. The concept of escheat or vacant succession can be considered a distant successor to this droit d'aubaine.

== Bibliography ==
- Wells, Charlotte Catherine (1992). The Language of citizenship in early modern France: Implications of the droit d'aubaine (dissertation). Indiana University. OCLC 26831014.
- Wells, Charlotte Catherine (1995). Law and citizenship in early modern France. Baltimore: Johns Hopkins University Press. ISBN 978-0-8018-4918-3. OCLC 30625071.
- Dubost, Jean-Pierre (1996). "Étrangers en France" [Foreigners in France]. In Bély, Lucien (ed.). Dictionnaire de l'Ancien Régime [Dictionary of the Ancien Régime] (in French). Paris: PUF.
- Cerutti, Simona (2012). Etrangers: Etude d'une condition d'incertitude dans une société d'Ancien Régime [Foreigners: Study of a Condition of Uncertainty in an Ancien Régime Society] (in French). Paris: Bayard. p. 301. ISBN 978-2-227-48303-3.
- Pothier, Robert-Joseph (1778). Traité des personnes et des choses [Treatise on Persons and Things] (in French). Paris.
- Rapport, Michael (2000). Nationality and Citizenship in Revolutionary France. Oxford: Oxford University Press. ISBN 978-0-19-820845-7. OCLC 249107355.
