= George Bancroft =

American historian and statesman (1800–1891)

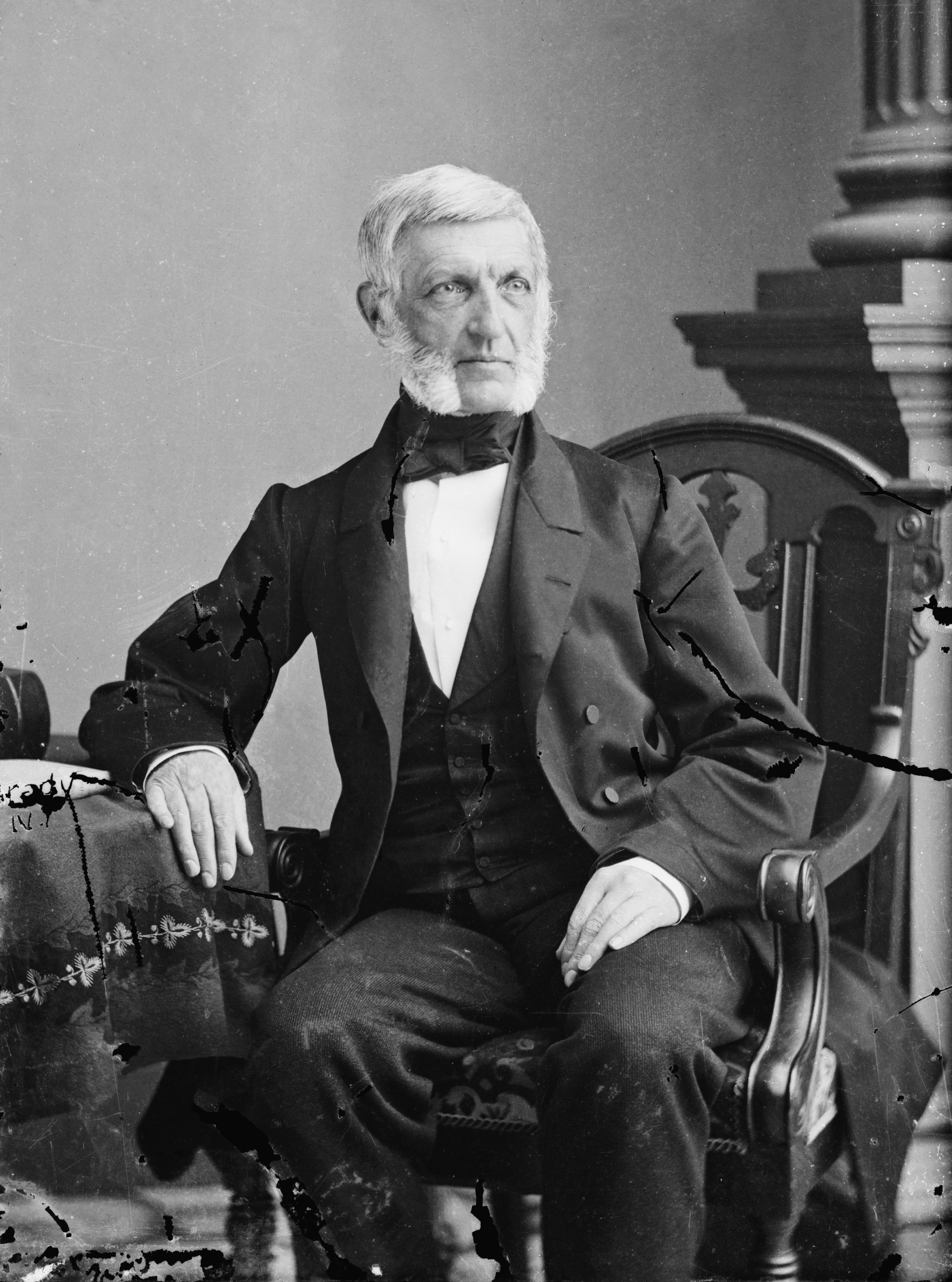
- Bancroft c. 1860

United States Minister to Germany
- In office May 10, 1871 – June 30, 1874
- President: Ulysses S. Grant
- Preceded by: Himself (Minister to Prussia)
- Succeeded by: Bancroft Davis

United States Minister to Prussia
- In office August 28, 1867 – May 10, 1871
- President: Andrew Johnson; Ulysses S. Grant
- Preceded by: Joseph A. Wright
- Succeeded by: Himself (Minister to Germany)

17th United States Minister to the United Kingdom
- In office November 12, 1846 – August 31, 1849
- Monarch: Victoria
- President: James K. Polk; Zachary Taylor
- Preceded by: Louis McLane
- Succeeded by: Abbott Lawrence

17th United States Secretary of the Navy
- In office March 11, 1845 – September 9, 1846
- President: James K. Polk
- Preceded by: John Y. Mason
- Succeeded by: John Y. Mason

5th Collector of the Port of Boston
- In office 1837–1841
- Appointed by: Martin Van Buren
- Preceded by: David Henshaw
- Succeeded by: Levi Lincoln Jr.

Personal details
- Born: October 3, 1800 Worcester, Massachusetts, U.S.
- Died: January 17, 1891 (aged 90) Washington, D.C., U.S.
- Party: Democratic
- Spouses: Sarah Dwight (m. 1827; died 1837); Elizabeth Davis Bliss
- Education: Harvard University (BA); University of Göttingen (MA, PhD)

Bancroft's bookplate and signature. "Eis phaos" is Greek for "Towards the Light".

George Bancroft (October 3, 1800 – January 17, 1891) was an American historian, statesman and Democratic politician who was prominent in promoting secondary education both in his home state of Massachusetts and at the national and international levels.

During his tenure as U.S. secretary of the Navy, he established the United States Naval Academy at Annapolis. He was a senior American diplomat in Europe, leading diplomatic missions to Britain and Germany. Among his best-known writings is the magisterial series, History of the United States, from the Discovery of the American Continent.

== Early life and education ==
Bancroft was born on October 3, 1800, in Worcester, Massachusetts. His family had been in Massachusetts Bay since 1632.

George's father, Aaron Bancroft, was distinguished as a Revolutionary War soldier, a leading Unitarian clergyman, and author of a popular biography of George Washington.

=== Education ===
Bancroft began his education at Phillips Exeter Academy.

Education there was not organized in a rigid sequence. Many students completed their studies by age 12 or 13, having progressed through what would now be considered grammar school. With no high schools in existence at the time, college followed directly. The preceptor, Benjamin Abbott, encouraged Bancroft toward a college with similar values — one that was religiously tolerant.

After Harvard, Bancroft's father sent him abroad to study in Germany, where he studied at the universities of Göttingen and Berlin. At Göttingen, he studied Plato with Arnold Hermann Ludwig Heeren, history with Heeren and Gottlieb Jakob Planck, languages (Note: Arabic, Hebrew, and New Testament Greek) and scripture interpretation with Albert Eichhorn, natural science with Johann Friedrich Blumenbach, German literature with Georg Friedrich Benecke, French and Italian literature with Artaud and Bunsen, and classics with Georg Ludolf Dissen. In 1820, he received his doctorate from the University of Göttingen.

Bancroft capped off his education with a European tour, in the course of which he sought out almost every distinguished man in the European world of letters, science and art, including Johann Wolfgang von Goethe, Wilhelm von Humboldt, Friedrich Daniel Ernst Schleiermacher, Georg Wilhelm Friedrich Hegel, Lord Byron, Barthold Georg Niebuhr, Christian Charles Josias Bunsen, Friedrich Carl von Savigny, Varnhagen von Ense, Victor Cousin, Benjamin Constant and Alessandro Manzoni.

== Early career ==
Bancroft returned to the United States in 1822. While the young man delivered several sermons at his father's behest shortly after his return, his love of literature proved a stronger attachment.

His first position was as a tutor of Greek at Harvard. Bancroft chafed at the narrow curriculum of Harvard in his day and the pedantic spirit of its classics curriculum. Moreover, his personal affect of ardent Romanticism subjected him to ridicule among the formal society of New England and his political sympathies for Jacksonian democracy put him at odds with nearly all of the Boston elite.

=== Round Hill School ===
In 1823, he published his first work, a little volume of poetry, translations and original pieces, which brought no fame. Bancroft finally left Cambridge and with Joseph Cogswell established the Round Hill School at Northampton, Massachusetts.

While at Round Hill, Bancroft contributed frequently to the North American Review and American Quarterly. He also made a translation of Arnold Hermann Ludwig Heeren's work on The Politics of Ancient Greece. In 1836, he published an oration advocating universal suffrage and the foundation of the state on the power of the whole people.

=== State politics ===
In 1830, he was elected to the Massachusetts State Senate from Northampton without his knowledge by the support of the Working Men's Party, but refused to take his seat. and the next year he declined another nomination, though certain to have been elected, for the state senate.

== Historian ==
Bancroft, having trained in the leading German universities, was an accomplished scholar, whose masterwork History of the United States, from the Discovery of the American Continent covered the new nation in depth down to 1789. His History of the United States started appearing in 1834, and he constantly revised it in numerous editions. It remains among the most comprehensive histories of colonial America.

=== Themes ===
Bancroft was a Romantic, emphasizing nationalist and republican values. Bancroft played on four recurring themes to explain the development of American values: providence, progress, patria, and pan-democracy. "Providence" meant that destiny depended more on God than on human will. The idea of "progress" indicated that through continuous reform a better society was possible. Patria was deserved because America's spreading influence would bring liberty and freedom to more and more of the world. "Pan-democracy" meant the nation-state was central to the drama, not specific heroes or villains.

Richard C. Vitzthum argues that Bancroft's histories exemplify his Unitarian moral vision of faith in progress. The history of America, in Bancroft's view, exemplified the gradual unfolding of God's purpose for mankind – the development of religious and political liberty.

George M. Frederickson argues that Bancroft's "universalist theory of national origins... made the American Revolution not only the fruit of a specific historical tradition, but also a creed of liberty for all mankind."

=== Historiographical reception and legacy ===
Bancroft's orotund romantic style and enthusiastic patriotism fell out of favor with later generations of scientific historians, who did not assign his books to students. After 1890, American scholars of the Imperial School took a more favorable view of the British Empire than Bancroft.

Edmund Morgan compares Bancroft's history to that of the Liberal statesman Sir George Trevelyan in that both reject the Progressive view of the Revolution as a mere invocation of political philosophy as a means to keep and consolidate power. Morgan and other neo-Whig historians have embraced Bancroft's view that the patriots were motivated by a deep commitment to individual liberty.

Inspired by Bancroft, Bernard Bailyn and a cohort of mid-twentieth-century historians challenged the dichotomy between "national self-awareness" and the study of history. Although they had found "limitations" in Bancroft's works, mid-twentieth-century "instrumentalist" historians wished to reexamine the "image of colonial origins" of the American Revolution. By 1956, this subset of scholars had tentatively determined that, "toward the end of the seventeenth century there emerged an entire apparatus of local politics" that "came, gradually, to accommodate itself" within the imperial system and in various "forms...it is their collapse under the pressures of new circumstances after 1760 that alone made the Revolution 'irrepressible.' "

== Political and diplomatic career ==
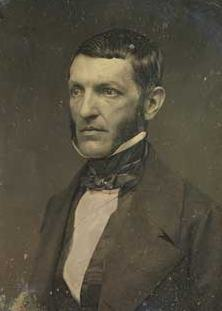
Bancroft in 1846

=== Collector of Boston ===
In 1837, Bancroft entered active politics by accepting an appointment as Collector of Customs of the Port of Boston by President Martin Van Buren. Two of his own appointees in the office were Orestes Brownson and author Nathaniel Hawthorne.

In 1844, Bancroft was the Democratic candidate for governor of Massachusetts but he was defeated. He called for the annexation of Texas as extending "the area of freedom" and opposed slavery.

=== Secretary of the Navy ===
In 1845, in recognition for his support at the previous Democratic convention, Bancroft was appointed to James Polk's cabinet as Secretary of the Navy, serving until 1846, when, for a month, he was acting Secretary of War.

During his short period in the cabinet, Bancroft established the United States Naval Academy at Annapolis, creating a legacy of education and leadership. He ordered naval action that resulted in the occupation of California and, as secretary of War, sent Zachary Taylor into the contested land between Texas and Mexico. That catalyzed the Mexican War, resulting in the United States greatly increasing its territory in the Southwest.

Bancroft designed and developed the Naval Academy; he received all the appropriations for which he asked. Congress had never been willing to establish a naval academy, but Bancroft studied the law to assess the powers of the Secretary of the Navy. He found that he could order "a place where midshipmen should wait for orders." He could also direct instructors to give lessons to them at sea, and by law, instructors could follow the midshipmen to the place of their common residence on shore. The appropriation of the year for the naval service met the expense, and the Secretary of War ceded an abandoned military post to the navy.

Therefore, when Congress came together, it learned that the midshipmen not at sea were housed at Annapolis. Thus, they were protected from the dangers of idleness and city life and busy at a regular course of study. Congress accepted the school, which was in full operation, and granted money for the repairs of the buildings.

Bancroft introduced some new respected professors into the corps of instructors, and he suggested a system of promotion, related to experience and achievements as well as age. The merit system was not fully developed or applied at the time. Bancroft was influential also in obtaining additional appropriations for the United States Naval Observatory.

=== Minister to the United Kingdom ===
Similarly, Bancroft studied so deeply the Oregon boundary dispute that in 1846, he was sent as minister plenipotentiary to London to work with the British government on the issue. There, he roomed with the historian Macaulay and the poet Hallam. With the election of Whig Zachary Taylor as president, Bancroft's political appointment ended. On his return to the United States in 1849, he withdrew from public life and moved to New York, where he focused on writing history.

=== Return to private life ===
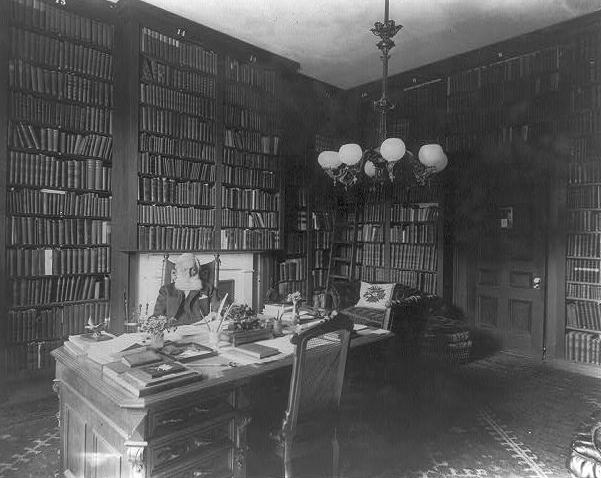
George Bancroft in his office (c. 1889)

As a private citizen, Bancroft initially expressed skepticism towards Abraham Lincoln's election, describing him as, "without brains," and "ignorant, self-willed, and... surrounded by men some of whom are almost as ignorant as himself." However, Bancroft softened to the wartime president after initiating correspondence with Lincoln in 1861, and used the communication to argue for the case of abolishing slavery. In April 1864, at Bancroft's request, President Abraham Lincoln wrote out what would become the fourth of five known manuscripts of the Gettysburg Address. Bancroft planned to include the copy in Autograph Leaves of Our Country's Authors, which he planned to sell at a Soldiers' and Sailors' Sanitary Fair, in Baltimore, to raise money to care for the Union Army.

In 1866, he was chosen by Congress to deliver the special eulogy on Lincoln.

=== Minister to Prussia and Germany ===
In 1867, President Andrew Johnson offered Bancroft the post of US minister to Prussia, enabling him to return to Germany. Bancroft remained in Berlin for seven years, throughout the Franco-Prussian War and German unification.

President Ulysses S. Grant appointed him minister to the German Empire in 1871. During his tenure in Berlin, Bancroft spent much time negotiating agreements with Prussia and the other north German states relating to naturalization and citizenship issues; they became known as the Bancroft Treaties in his honor. The treaties were the first international recognition of the right of expatriation. The principle has since incorporated in the law of nations.

=== San Juan Islands arbitration ===
His last official achievements were his participation in the 1872 arbitration on the status of the San Juan Islands, stemming from the Pig War of 1859. The United States maintained that the disputed channel was intended to be the Haro Strait, while Great Britain believed that it was the Rosario Strait. In the San Juan arbitration Bancroft displayed great versatility and skill and won the case, which was decided by a commission (three eminent German Judges) appointed by the German Emperor, Kaiser Wilhelm I. The final ruling was issued on October 21, 1872, and British troops withdrew from San Juan Island on November 22, 1872, after 26 years of maintaining an amicable, yet tense relationship.

== Personal life ==
=== Family ===
His first wife was Sarah Dwight, of a rich family in Springfield, Massachusetts; they married in 1827 and had two sons. She died in 1837. He formed a second marriage with Mrs Elizabeth Davis Bliss, a widow with two children. Together they had a daughter.

In his later years Bancroft lived in Washington, D.C., summering at Rose Cliff, Newport, Rhode Island, the site where Rosecliff was later built.

=== Organizations ===
Bancroft was elected a member of the American Antiquarian Society in 1838, and also served as its Secretary of Domestic Correspondence from 1877 to 1880.

In 1841, Bancroft was elected as a member of the American Philosophical Society.

In New York, Bancroft was a founding member of the American Geographical Society and served as the society's first president for nearly three years (February 21, 1852 – December 7, 1854).

Bancroft was elected an Associate Fellow of the American Academy of Arts and Sciences in 1863.

Bancroft served as the President of the American Historical Association, 1885-1886.

== Death ==
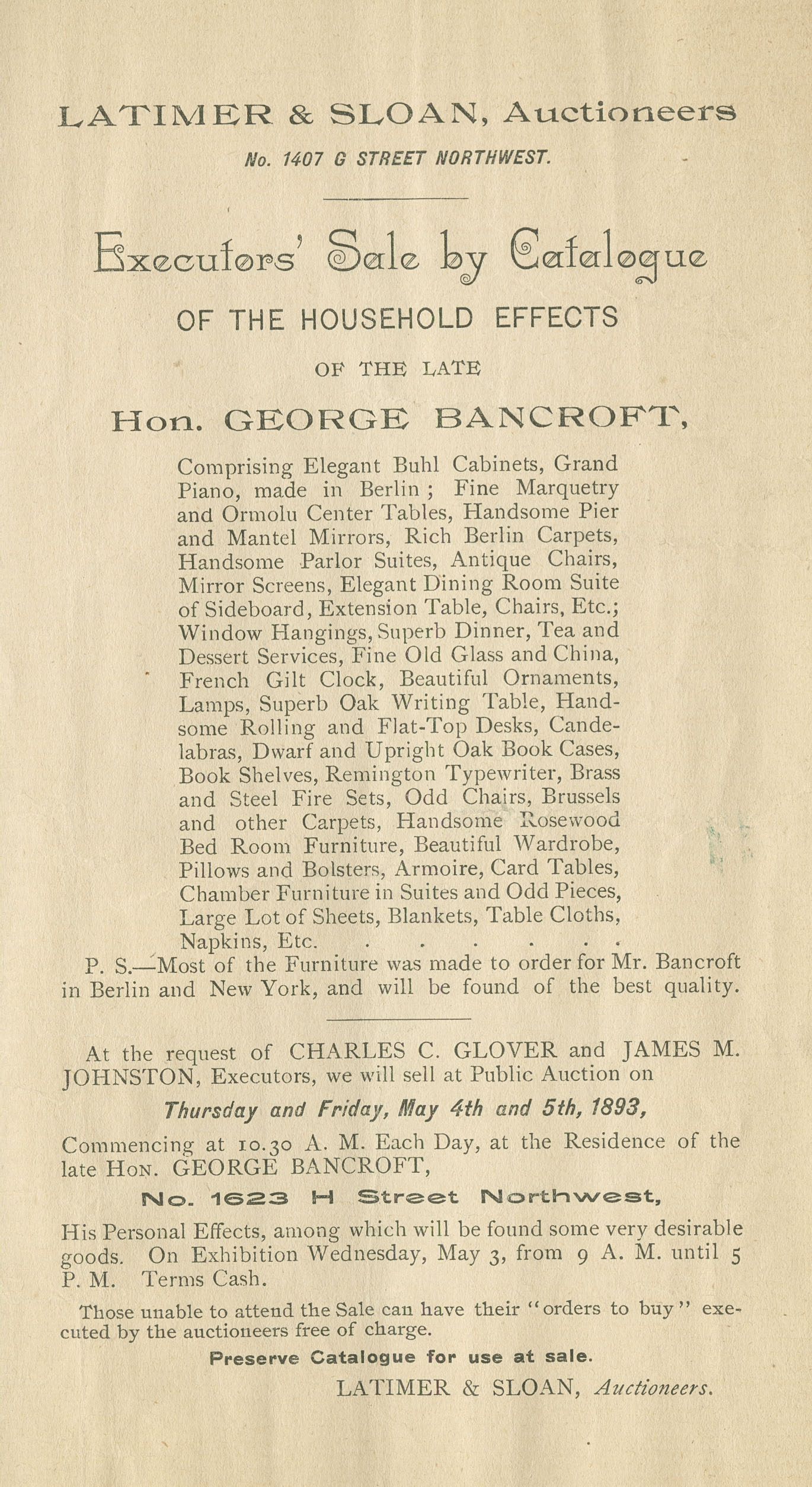
Latimer & Sloan Auction Catalog Title Page, Bancroft Sale, 1893

Bancroft died in 1891, in Washington, D.C. He was the last surviving member of the Polk cabinet.

== Works ==
=== Major works ===
- Bancroft, George. History of the United States of America, from the Discovery of the American Continent. (Boston: Little, Brown, and company, 8 volumes, 1854–1860, with numerous editions since).
- Bancroft, George. History of the Formation of the Constitution of the United States of America.(New York, D. Appleton and Company, 1882, Vol 1) online edition
- Bancroft, George. Martin Van Buren to the End of His Public Career. New York: Harper & Brothers, 1889. online edition
- Bancroft, George; Dyer, Oliver, 1824–1907. (1891) History of the Battle of Lake Erie, and Miscellaneous Papers (New York: R. Bonner's sons) 292 pp. (American Library Association) online edition

=== Minor publications ===
- Poems, Hilliard and Metcalf (Cambridge, 1823)
- An Oration Delivered on July 4, 1826, at Northampton, Mass. (Northampton, 1826)
- History of the Political System of Europe, translated from Heeren (1829)
- An Oration delivered before the Democracy of Springfield and Neighboring Towns, July 4, 1836 (2d ed., with prefatory remarks, Springfield, 1836)
- History of the Colonization of the United States (Boston, 1841, 12mo, abridged)
- An Oration delivered at the Commemoration, in Washington, of the Death of Andrew Jackson, June 27, 1845
- The Necessity, the Reality, and the Promise of the Progress of the Human Race (1854)
- An Oration delivered before the New York Historical Society, November 20, 1854 (New York, 1854)
- Proceedings of the First Assembly of Virginia, 1619; Communicated, with an Introductory Note, by George Bancroft
- Literary and Historical Miscellanies (New York, 1855)
- Collections of the New York Historical Society, second series, vol. iii., part i. (New York, 1857)
- Memorial Address on the Life and Character of Abraham Lincoln, delivered at the request of both Houses of the Congress of America, before them, in the House of Representatives at Washington, on February 12, 1866 (Washington, 1866) via Archive.org
- A Plea for the Constitution of the United States of America, Wounded in the House of its Guardians Veritati Unice Litarem (New York, 1886)

Among his other speeches and addresses may be mentioned a lecture on "The Culture, the Support, and the Object of Art in a Republic," in the course of the New York Historical Society in 1852; and one on "The Office, Appropriate Culture, and Duty of the Mechanic."

Bancroft contributed a biography of Jonathan Edwards to the American Cyclopædia.

== Namesakes and monuments ==
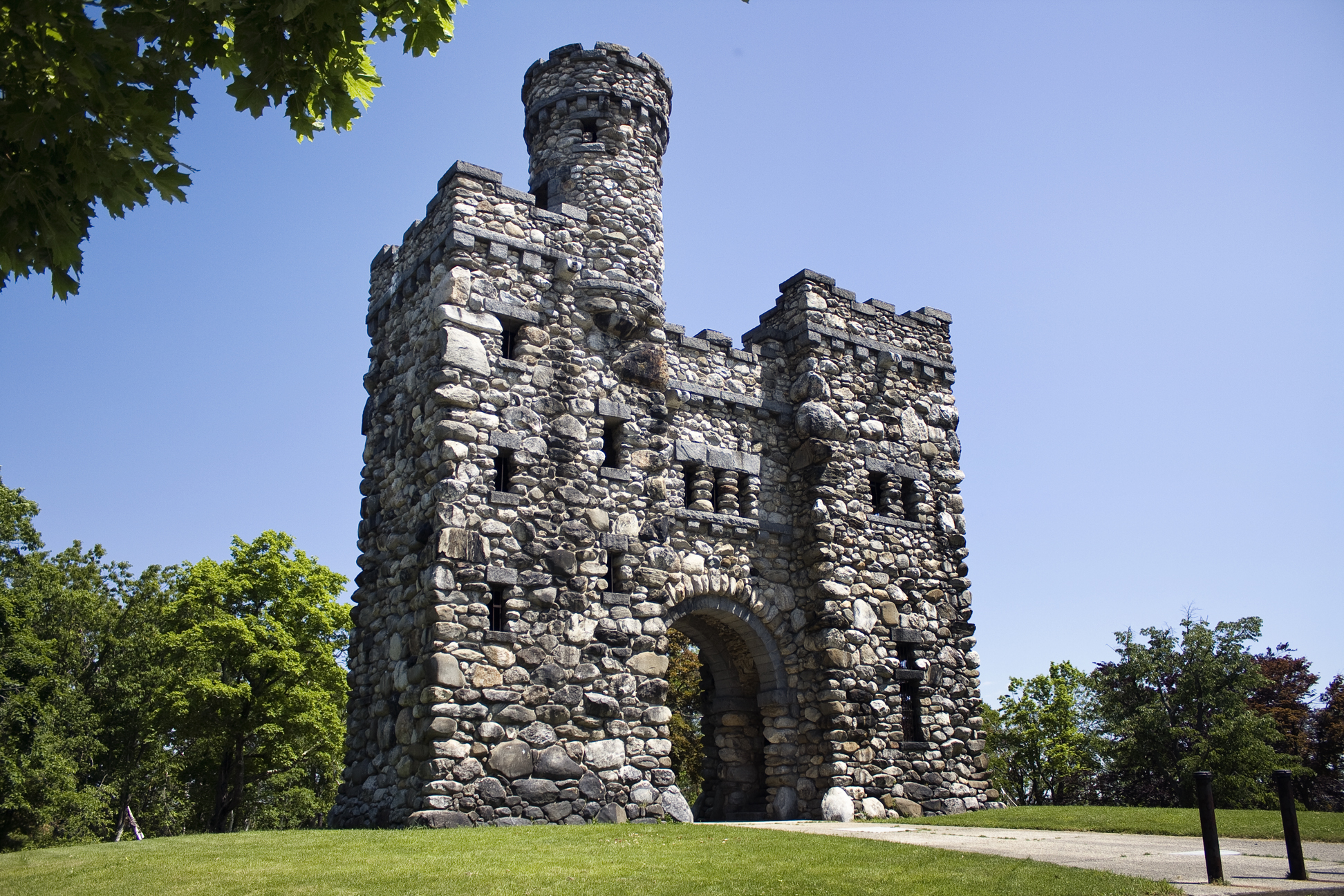
Bancroft Tower, Worcester, Massachusetts

The United States Navy has named several ships USS Bancroft for him, as well as the fleet ballistic missile submarine USS George Bancroft (SSBN-643), the mid-19th century United States Coast Survey schooner USCS Bancroft and steel gunboat USS Bancroft (1892)

The dormitory at the United States Naval Academy, Bancroft Hall, is named after him. It is the largest single dormitory in the world.

Bancroft is one of 23 famous names on the $1 educational currency note of 1896.

The name of Bancroft, honoring George Bancroft, is found atop one of several marble pillars in the Thomas Jefferson Building of the United States Library of Congress in Washington, D.C.

Many schools, streets, towns, etc. bear his name:

- Bancroft School, Worcester, MA
- Bancroft Hall at Phillips Exeter Academy, Exeter, New Hampshire.
- Bancroft Tower, erected in his honor in Salisbury Park, Worcester, MA
- Bancroft Commons, an apartment building in downtown Worcester, MA
- Bancroft Motors, now owned by HARR Motor Company
- Bancroft Street, Gardner, MA
- Bancroft Street, Worcester, MA
- Bancroft Elementary School, (in the Bancroft neighborhood of the City of) Minneapolis, MN
- Bancroft Elementary School, (in the Mount Pleasant neighborhood of) Washington, D.C.
- Bancroft Elementary School, Scranton, Pennsylvania
- Bancroft's Talon, an item in the 2014 MOBA Smite
- Bancroft, Iowa
- Bancroft, Maine
- Bancroft, Michigan

Bancroft is interred at Rural Cemetery in Worcester.

== Citations ==
Party political offices
| Preceded by Marcus Morton | Democratic nominee for Governor of Massachusetts; 1844 | Succeeded by Isaac Davis |
Government offices
| Preceded by John Y. Mason | United States Secretary of the Navy; 1845–1846 | Succeeded by John Y. Mason |
Diplomatic posts
| Preceded by Louis McLane | United States Minister to Britain; 1846–1849 | Succeeded by Abbott Lawrence |
| Preceded by Joseph A. Wright | United States Minister to Prussia; 1867–1874 | Succeeded by Bancroft Davis |
