= United States declaration of war on Germany (1917) =

Declaration of war with Germany
- Long title: "Joint Resolution Declaring that a State of War exists between the Imperial German Government and the Government and the people of the United States and making provision to prosecute the same."
- Enacted by: the 65th United States Congress
- Effective: April 6, 1917

Citations
- Public law: Pub. L. 65–1
- Statutes at Large: 40 Stat. 1

Legislative history
- Introduced in the Senate as S.J.Res.1 by Thomas S. Martin (D–VA) on April 2, 1917; Passed the U.S. Senate on April 2, 1917 (82-6 [6 not voting]); Passed the U.S. House of Representatives on April 5-6, 1917 (373-50 [8 not voting]); Signed into law by President Woodrow Wilson on April 6, 1917

The United States declared war on the German Empire on April 6, 1917. President Woodrow Wilson asked a special joint session of the United States Congress for a declaration of war on April 2, 1917, which passed in the Senate on the same day and then in the House of Representatives four days later on April 6. Wilson signed it into law the same day, making the United States officially involved in the First World War.

Despite heavy opposition to the war initially, several incidents resulted in the United States public largely turning against Germany and its allies by 1917. In his speech to the Congress, Wilson stated that the war would make the world ''safe for democracy'' and cited the German Empire's decision to resume unrestricted submarine warfare as an attack on not only Europe, but the United States as well.

== President Wilson's speech to Congress ==
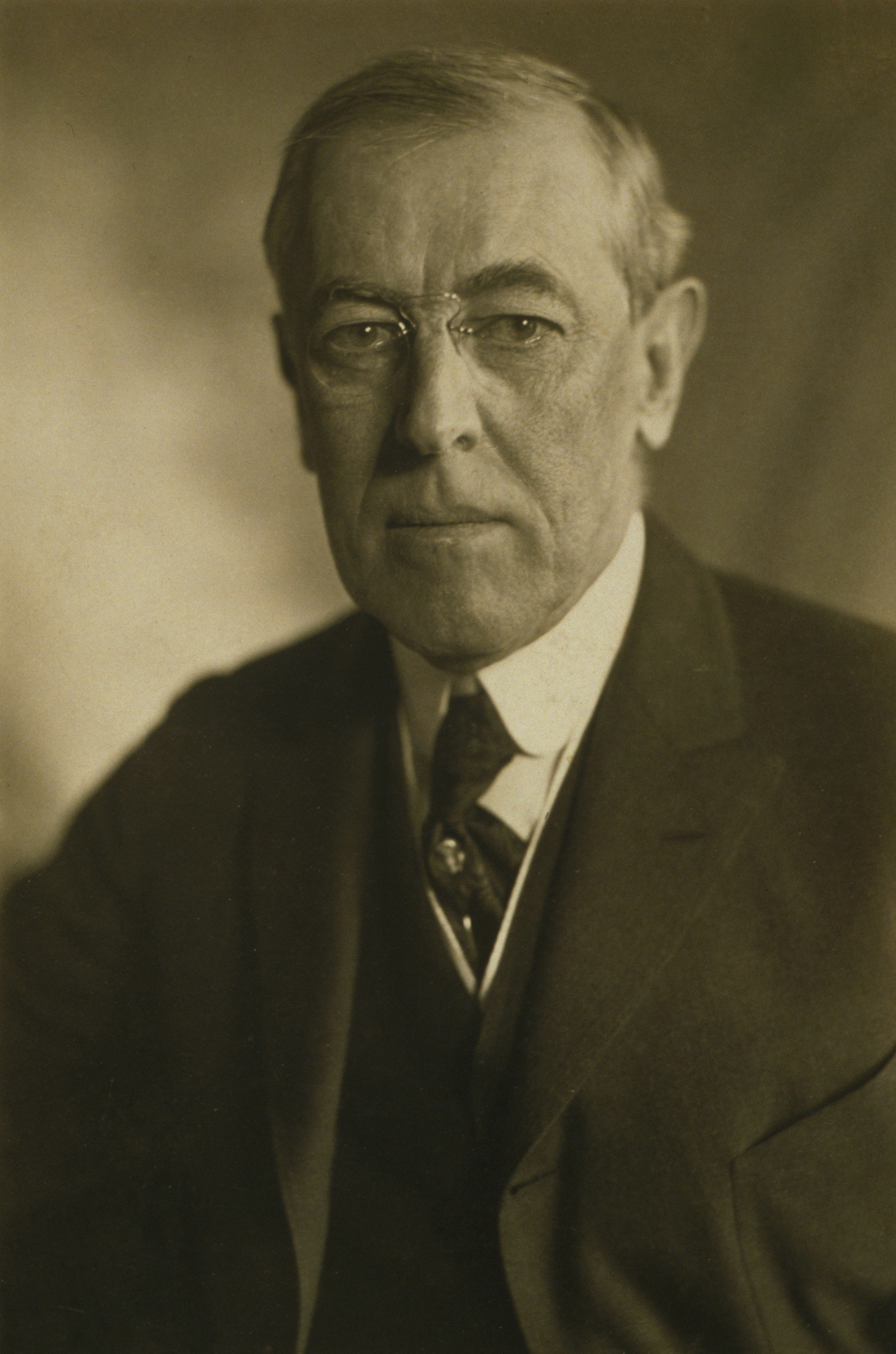
President Woodrow Wilson in 1919

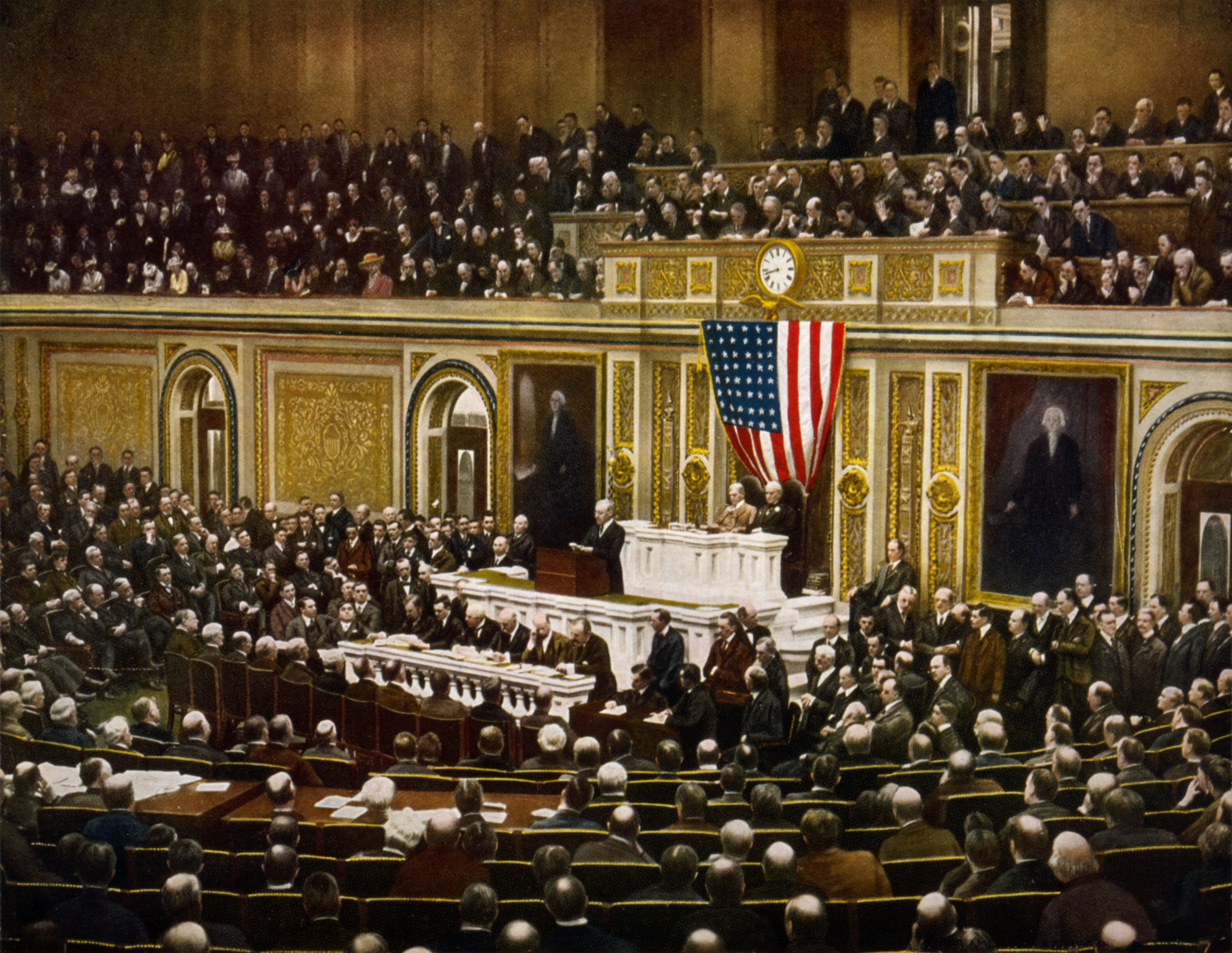
President Woodrow Wilson asking Congress to declare war on Germany on April 2, 1917.

On April 2, 1917, President Woodrow Wilson asked Congress to declare war on the German Empire (but, for the moment, not against Germany's allies) in a speech whose transcript reads in part:

I have called the Congress into extraordinary session because there are serious, very serious, choices of policy to be made, and made immediately, which it was neither right nor constitutionally permissible that I should assume the responsibility of making. On the 3rd of February last, I officially laid before you the extraordinary announcement of the Imperial German government that on and after the 1st day of February it was its purpose to put aside all restraints of law or of humanity and use its submarines to sink every vessel that sought to approach either the ports of Great Britain and Ireland or the western coasts of Europe or any of the ports controlled by the enemies of Germany within the Mediterranean...

When I addressed the Congress on the 26th of February last, I thought that it would suffice to assert our neutral rights with arms, our right to use the seas against unlawful interference, our right to keep our people safe against unlawful violence. But armed neutrality, it now appears, is impracticable... Armed neutrality is ineffectual enough at best; in such circumstances and in the face of such pretensions it is worse than ineffectual: it is likely only to produce what it was meant to prevent; it is practically certain to draw us into the war without either the rights or the effectiveness of belligerents. There is one choice we cannot make, we are incapable of making: we will not choose the path of submission and suffer the most sacred rights of our nation and our people to be ignored or violated. The wrongs against which we now array ourselves are no common wrongs; they cut to the very roots of human life.

With a profound sense of the solemn and even tragical character of the step I am taking and of the grave responsibilities which it involves, but in unhesitating obedience to what I deem my constitutional duty, I advise that the Congress declare the recent course of the Imperial German government to be in fact nothing less than war against the government and people of the United States; that it formally accept the status of belligerent which has thus been thrust upon it; and that it take immediate steps, not only to put the country in a more thorough state of defense but also to exert all its power and employ all its resources to bring the government of the German Empire to terms and end the war...

The world must be made safe for democracy. Its peace must be planted upon the tested foundations of political liberty. We have no selfish ends to serve. We desire no conquest, no dominion. We seek no indemnities for ourselves, no material compensation for the sacrifices we shall freely make. We are but one of the champions of the rights of mankind. We shall be satisfied when those rights have been made as secure as the faith and the freedom of nations can make them...

== Text of the declaration ==
WHEREAS, The Imperial German Government has committed repeated acts of war against the Government and the people of the United States of America; therefore, be it resolved by the Senate and House of Representatives of the United States of America in Congress assembled, That the state of war between the United States and the Imperial German Government, which has thus been thrust upon the United States, is hereby formally declared; and that the President be, and he is hereby, authorized and directed to employ the entire naval and military forces of the United States and the resources of the Government to carry on war against the Imperial German Government; and to bring the conflict to a successful termination all the resources of the country are hereby pledged by the Congress of the United States.

== Senator La Follette's response ==
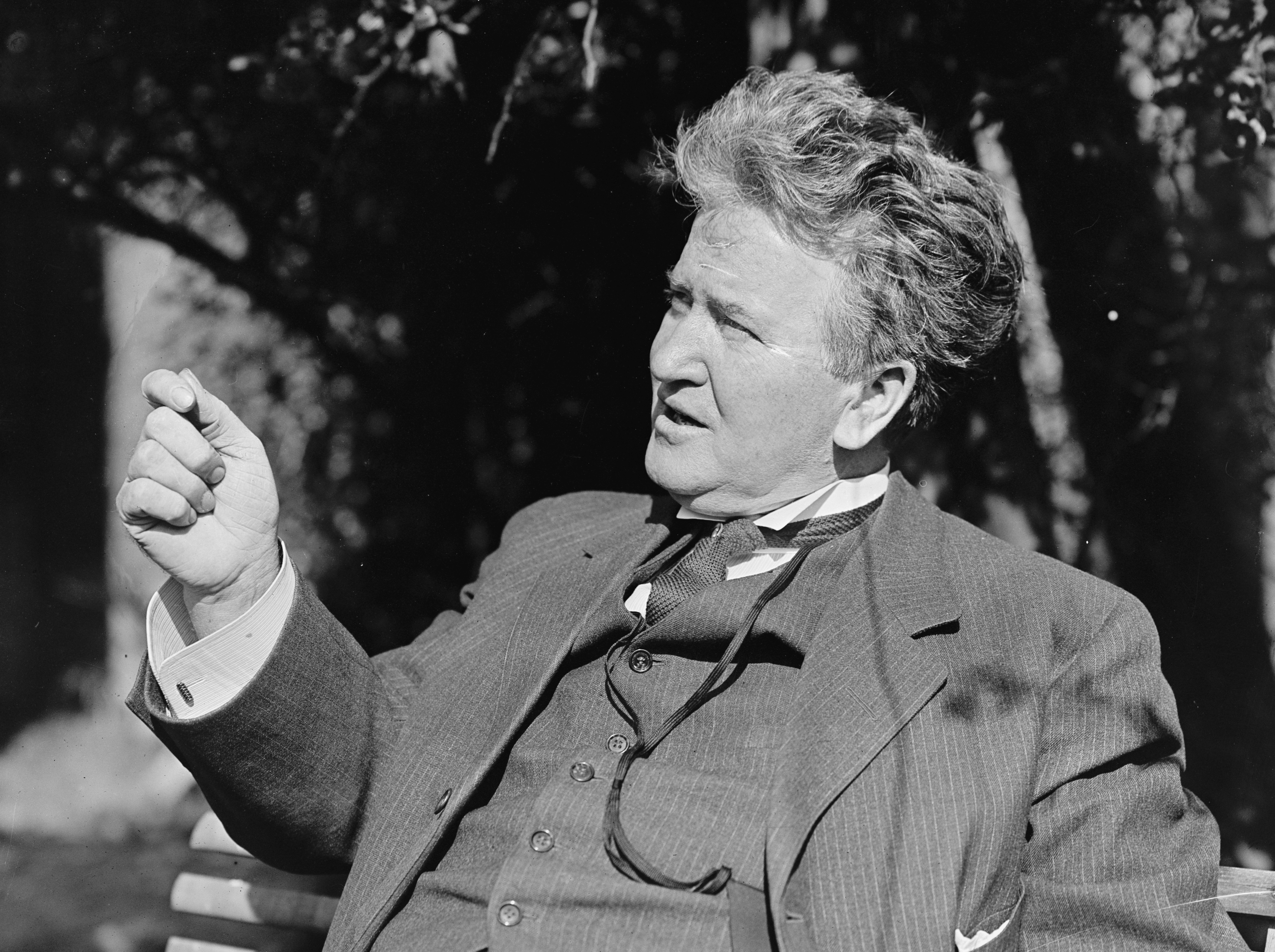
Sen. Robert La Follette in 1912

During Senate debate on April 4, Senator Robert M. La Follette of Wisconsin, a leader of the progressive Republicans (and the Progressive Party's presidential candidate in 1924) delivered a long speech in opposition to a declaration of war, during which he said:

I am talking now about principles. You cannot distinguish between the principles which allowed England to mine a large area of the Atlantic Ocean and the North Sea in order to shut in Germany, and the principle on which Germany by her submarines seeks to destroy all shipping which enters the war zone which she has laid out around the British Isles.

The English mines are intended to destroy without warning every ship that enters the war zone she has proscribed, killing or drowning every passenger that cannot find some means of escape. It is neither more nor less than that which Germany tries to do with her submarines in her war zone. We acquiesced in England’s action without protest. It is proposed that we now go to war with Germany for identically the same action upon her part. . . .

I say again that when two nations are at war any neutral nation, in order to preserve its character as a neutral nation, must exact the same conduct from both warring nations; both must equally obey the principles of international law. If a neutral nation fails in that, then its rights upon the high seas—to adopt the President’s phrase—are relative and not absolute. There can be no greater violation of our neutrality than the requirement that one of two belligerents shall adhere to the settled principles of law and that the other shall have the advantage of not doing so. The respect that German naval authorities were required to pay to the rights of our people upon the high seas would depend upon the question whether we had exacted the same rights from German’s enemies. If we had not done so, we lost our character as a neutral nation and our people unfortunately had lost the protection that belongs to neutrals. Our responsibility was joint in the sense that we must exact the same conduct from both belligerents.

The failure to treat the belligerent nations of Europe alike, the failure to reject the unlawful “war zones” of both Germany and Great Britain is wholly accountable for our present dilemma. We should not seek to hide our blunder behind the smoke of battle to inflame the mind of our people by half truths into the frenzy of war in order that they may never appreciate the real cause of it until it is too late. I do not believe that our national honor is served by such a course. The right way is the honorable way.

== Votes ==
In the Senate, the resolution passed 82–6 (8 not voting) on April 4.

In the House of Representatives, the resolution passed at 3 a.m. April 6 by a vote of 373–50 (8 not voting). One of the dissenters was Republican Rep. Jeannette Rankin of Montana, who later became the only member of either chamber of Congress to vote against declaring war against the Japanese Empire on December 8, 1941.

=== Breakdown by political party and geographical region ===
==== Senate ====
Senate vote by party	Yea	Nay	N/V	Yea margin
percentage	93%	7%		+ 86%
96 Members	82	6	(8)	+ 76
54 Democrats	44	3	(7)	+ 41
42 Republicans	38	3	(1)	+ 35
source: GovTrack.US

Forty-four (44) Democratic and 38 Republican Senators voted for the Declaration. Three Democrats and three Republicans voted against it. Seven Democrats and one Republican did not vote.

In the U.S. Senate, the negative votes were cast by Republican members Asle Gronna (N. Dakota), Robert M. La Follette (Wisconsin) and George W. Norris (Nebraska), together with Democratic members Harry Lane (Oregon), William J. Stone (Missouri), and James K. Vardaman (Mississippi).

One Republican Senator (Nathan Goff of W. Va) did not vote, nor did seven Democrats: John H. Bankhead (Alabama), Thomas Gore (Okla.), Henry F. Hollis (N.H.), Francis G. Newlands (Nevada), John Walter Smith (Maryland), Charles S. Thomas (Colo.), and Benjamin Tillman (S. Car.)

==== House of Representatives ====
House vote by party	Yea	Nay	N/V	Yea margin
percentage	88%	12%		+ 76%
431 Members	373	50	(8)	+ 323
213 Republicans	176	32	(5)	+ 144
212 Democrats	193	16	(3)	+ 177
3 Progressives	3			+ 3
Ind. Republican	1			+ 1
Socialist		1		– 1
Prohibitionist		1		– 1
source: GovTrack.US

Sixteen Democrats, 32 Republicans, the only Prohibitionist and the only Socialist in the House voted against the Declaration. On the other hand all three Progressive Party members and the only Independent Republican member voted for it — as did 193 Democrats and 176 Republicans. (Five Republicans and three Democrats did not vote on the question.)

Of the 50 members who voted against the resolution, 42 represented Western and Midwestern states (as did five of the six Senators who had voted against it in their own chamber).

Only three (a Michigan Republican, an Ohio Democrat, and a New York Socialist) (Note: Representatives Meyer London of New York — the House's only Socialist Party member, Isaac Sherwood — an Ohio Democrat, and Mark R. Bacon — a Michigan Republican) came from Northern states east of Illinois (Note: Michigan, Indiana, Ohio, Pennsylvania, New Jersey, New York and New England) and only five (Democrats from Alabama, Texas and the Carolinas) (Note: Representatives Claude Kitchin of North Carolina, Frederick H. Dominick of South Carolina, Edward B. Almon of Alabama, John L. Burnett, also of Alabama, and A. Jeff McLemore of Texas) from the Southern states. (Note: Virginia, North & South Carolina, Georgia, Florida, Alabama, Mississippi, Arkansas and Louisiana)

(No Representative from New England (Note: Maine, New Hampshire, Vermont, Massachusetts, Rhode Island and Connecticut) or from the Border States east of Missouri (Note: Tennessee, Kentucky, West Virginia, Maryland and Delaware) voted against the declaration.)

The three Northern Representatives out of 168 who voted against the declaration represented 2% of the Northern delegations, while the five Southern members who voted Nay constituted only 4% of the 128 Representatives from Southern and Border states.

However, nine out of 33 Representatives (27%) from the Far West (Note: California, Oregon, Washington, Idaho, Montana, Wyoming, Colorado, Utah, Nevada, Arizona and New Mexico) voted against the declaration: three (one Democrat, one Republican, and one Prohibitionist) out of California's eleven Representatives; two of Washington state's five; two of Colorado's four; one (Jeannette Rankin) of Montana's two; and Nevada's sole Representative.

So did 33 out of 102 (32%) from the Mid-West: (Note: Illinois, Wisconsin, Minnesota, Iowa, Missouri, Oklahoma, Kansas, Nebraska, South Dakota and North Dakota) 9 out of 11 members from Wisconsin, 4 out of 10 from Minnesota, 6 out of 27 from Illinois, 4 out of 15 from Missouri, 3 out of 6 from Nebraska, 3 out of 11 from Iowa, 2 out of 3 from South Dakota and 2 out of 8 from Kansas. (All but six of the 33 Midwestern opponents of the declaration were Republicans; but the nine Far Western votes against the declaration were evenly divided between four Democrats, four Republicans and one Prohibitionist.) (Note: In other words — in addition to the New York Socialist and the California Prohibitionist — 5 of the 16 Democratic opponents of the war came from the South, 1 from Ohio, 6 from the rest of the Mid-West and 4 from the Far West, while the 32 Republican opponents can be divided less evenly between 27 Midwesterners, 4 Westerners and 1 Michigander. ¶ Arranged alternately by region, all 5 Southern opponents were Democrats; the 3 Northern opponents split evenly between 1 Democrat, 1 Republican and 1 Socialist; the 33 Midwestern opponents divided between 27 Republicans and 6 Democrats; and the 9 Western opponents divided evenly between 4 Democrats, 4 Republicans and 1 Prohibitionist.)

== Signatures ==
Immediately after the resolution was passed by the House, it was signed by House Speaker, Champ Clark. About nine hours later, at 12:14 p.m., it was signed by Vice President Thomas R. Marshall. Less than an hour later, President Wilson signed it at 1:11 p.m., and the United States was officially at war against the German Empire.

== See also ==
- American entry into World War I
- Declarations of war during World War I
- United Kingdom declaration of war upon Germany (1914)
- United States declaration of war on Austria-Hungary
- United States declaration of war upon Germany (1941)

== Sources ==
- "Declaration of War With Germany, WWI (S.J.Res. 1)" United States Senate website
- "About Declarations of War by Congress". U.S. Senate.
- "The House Declaration of War Against Germany in 1917". Historian of the U.S. House of Representatives. April 06, 1917.
