= Bancroft (surname) =

Bancroft is a place name-derived English surname originating in the 13th century with three purported origins: the locale Bancroft in Ardeley, Hertfordshire; the locale of Bancroft Field in Soham, Cambridgeshire; or an Old English transliteration of the phrase "dweller by the bean field'. Bancroft is thought to be related in origin to two other surnames, Bangcroft and Bencroft.

Notable people sharing this surname include

- Bancroft family, previous owners of Dow Jones & Company
- Aaron Bancroft (1755–1839), Colonial American clergyman and Revolutionary War soldier
- Ann Bancroft (born 1955), American explorer
- Anne Bancroft (1931–2005), American actress
- Billy Bancroft (1871–1959), Welsh international rugby union player and county cricketer
- Cameron Bancroft (cricketer) (born 1992), Australian cricketer
- Cameron Bancroft (actor) (born 1967), Canadian actor
- Dalton Bancroft (born 2001), Canadian ice hockey player
- Dave Bancroft (1891–1972), American baseball player and member of the Baseball Hall of Fame
- Edward Bancroft (1744–1821), American spy and double agent in the American Revolutionary War, first for the American, then for the British
- Edward Nathaniel Bancroft (1772–1842), English physician, botanist, and zoologist
- Effie Bancroft (1839–1921), English actress and theatre manager
- Frederick J. Bancroft (1834–1903), American physician
- Frederick Bancroft (educator) (1855–1929), Canadian educator
- George Bancroft (1800–1891), American historian, statesman, and Secretary of the Navy
- George Bancroft (actor) (1882–1956), American actor
- Gertrude Bancroft (1908–1985), American economist
- Helen Bancroft (1887–1950), British botanist and botanical illustrator
- H. Hugh Bancroft (1904–1988), British organist and composer
- Hugh Bancroft (attorney) (1879–1933), American publisher and attorney
- Hubert Howe Bancroft (1832–1918), American historian and ethnologist
- Huldah Bancroft (died 1966), American biostatistician
- Ian Bancroft, Baron Bancroft (1922–1996), British civil servant
- Jack Bancroft (1879–1942), Welsh international rugby union player and county cricketer
- Jessie Hubbell Bancroft (1867–1952), American educator, a pioneer of physical education
- John Bancroft (bishop) (1574–1640), bishop of Oxford
- John Bancroft (dramatist) (died 1696), English dramatist
- John Bancroft (architect) (1928–2011), British architect
- John Bancroft (sexologist) (born 1936), American physician
- John Bancroft (businessman), 21st century British businessman
- Joseph Bancroft (1836–1894), English-born Australian surgeon and parasitologist
- Lincoln Bancroft (1877–1942), American politician
- Mary Bancroft (1903–1997), American novelist and spy
- G. Michael Bancroft (born 1942), Canadian chemist
- Natalie Bancroft (born circa 1980), American businesswoman
- Ria Bancroft (1907–1993), New Zealand sculptor
- Richard Bancroft (1544–1610), English clergyman and Archbishop of Canterbury
- Ryan Bancroft (born 1989), American conductor
- Squire Bancroft (1841–1926), aka Sydney Bancroft, English actor and theatre manager
- Stephen H. Bancroft, American theologian and educator
- T. A. Bancroft (1907–1986), American statistician
- T. D. Bancroft (1837–1917), American temperance movement activist, writer, and public speaker on the Lincoln assassination
- Thomas Bancroft (poet) (c. 1596 – 1658), English poet
- Thomas Bancroft (MP) (died 1636), English Member of Parliament
- Thomas Bancroft (priest) (1756–1811), English Anglican vicar
- Thomas Lane Bancroft (1860–1933), Australian physician, naturalist, and entomologist
- Tom Bancroft (born 1967), British jazz drummer and composer
- Tony Bancroft (born 1967), American animator
- Wilder Dwight Bancroft (1867–1953), American chemist
