= Bancroft =

Bancroft may refer to:

== People ==
- Bancroft (surname)

== Places ==
=== United States ===
- Bancroft, Idaho, a city
- Bancroft, Iowa, a city
- Bancroft, Kentucky, a home rule-class city
- Bancroft, Louisiana, an unincorporated area
- Bancroft, Maine, a township
- Bancroft, Michigan, a village
- Bancroft, Minneapolis, Minnesota, a neighborhood
- Bancroft, Missouri, an unincorporated community
- Bancroft, Nebraska, a village
- Bancroft, South Dakota, a town
- Bancroft, West Virginia, a town
- Bancroft, Wisconsin, a census-designated place
- Bancroft County, Iowa, a former county
- Bancroft Creek, a stream in Minnesota
- Bancroft Township, Freeborn County, Minnesota
- Bancroft Township, Cuming County, Nebraska

=== Elsewhere ===
- Bancroft, Queensland, Australia, a locality in the North Burnett Region
- Bancroft, Ontario, Canada, a town
- Bancroft, Milton Keynes, UK, a district
- former name of Chililabombwe, Copperbelt Province, Zambia, a town
- Bancroft (crater), a crater on the Moon

== Arts and entertainment ==
- Bancroft (TV series), a 2017 British TV series
- Bancroft Pons, a fictional character in the Solar Pons stories by August Derleth
- George Bancroft, protagonist of the 1980 film Hangar 18
- Bancroft Prize, an American literary award from Columbia University
- Bancroft Gold Medal, a British acting award named after Sir Squire Bancroft, first president of RADA

== Schools ==
- Bancroft Middle School (Los Angeles, California), an American public middle school
- Bancroft Middle School (San Leandro, California), an American public middle school
- Bancroft School, an American private K-12 school in Worcester, Massachusetts
- Bancroft School of Massage Therapy, an American trade school in Worcester, Massachusetts
- Bancroft's School, a British independent school in Woodford Green, London

== Ships ==
- USCS Bancroft, a schooner in commission as a survey ship in the United States Coast Survey from 1846 to 1862
- USS Bancroft, the name of more than one United States Navy ship
- USS George Bancroft (SSBN-643), a United States Navy fleet ballistic missile submarine in commission from 1966 to 1993
- Bancroft (motor vessel), a 1925 ship preserved in Baltimore, Maryland, in the United States

== Other uses ==
- Bancroft Hall, a dormitory at the United States Naval Academy
- Bancroft Hall, a dormitory at Phillips Exeter Academy
- Bancroft Library, University of California at Berkeley, United States
- Bancroft Mills, a factory in Wilmington, Delaware, United States
- Bancroft Point, a real binary system where the components have equal saturation pressure and exhibit azeotropy
- Bancroft PLLC, an American law firm
