= George Bancroft (disambiguation) =

George Bancroft (1800–1891) was an American historian and statesman.

George Bancroft may also refer to:

- George Bancroft (actor) (1882–1956), American actor
- George Bancroft (translator) (died 1573), English clergyman and translator
- USS George Bancroft, a United States Navy fleet ballistic missile submarine in commission from 1966 to 1993
- George Bancroft Park, Blackpool, a municipal park and garden in the town of Blackpool in Lancashire, England

== See also ==
- Bancroft (disambiguation)
