= Frederick Bancroft =

Frederick Bancroft may refer to:

- Frederick Bancroft (educator) (1855–1929), Canadian educator
- Frederick J. Bancroft (1834–1903), American physician

== See also ==
- Frederic Bancroft (1860–1945), American historian, author, and librarian
