= Monument Square Park =

Public park in Boston, Massachusetts, U.S.

- Looking north in 2019, the park (with the Bunker Hill Monument in its center) is in the foreground
- Interactive map of Monument Square Park
- Type: Urban park
- Location: Boston, Massachusetts, United States
- Coordinates: 42.376258°N 71.060830°W
- Area: 3.8 acres (1.5 ha)
- Owner: City of Boston
- Public transit: MBTA bus routes 89 and 93

Monument Square Park is an urban park in Boston, Massachusetts, United States. Located in the city's Charlestown neighborhood, in the Monument Square Historic District, the park's focal point is the Bunker Hill Monument, a 221-foot-tall (67 m) obelisk. Erected between 1825 and 1843, the obelisk stands in the center of the park, which covers 3.8 acres (1.5 ha). Also in the park, immediately to the south of the Bunker Hill Monument, is a statue of William Prescott, an American Revolutionary War hero.

The Bunker Hill Monument and, by association, Monument Square Park are stops on the Freedom Trail, a path connecting historic sites in Boston. Sequentially, it is the last stop after the USS Constitution. A red-brick strip marking the trail's route is embedded into the walkways. The strip formerly passed through two of the park's entrances, but in the 1990s, a portion of the strip at one entrance was removed to reduce confusion.

The streets bounding the park on all four sides are named Monument Square.

== Description ==
Monument Square Park surrounds the Bunker Hill Monument, built atop a Continental Army fortification on the summit of Breed's Hill, where in 1775 the Battle of Bunker Hill took place during the American Revolutionary War. The park is a 3.8-acre (1.5 ha) square, (Note: The park's grounds include 3.8 acres (1.5 ha) within the perimeter fence. The surrounding streets and sidewalks bring the parcel to 6.12 acres (2.48 ha).) surrounded by an avenue also named Monument Square. An iron fence runs along Monument Square Park's perimeter, with hexagonal posts topped by hexagonal caps and triangular finials. There are quatrefoil and pendant motifs at the bottom of the fence, along with granite blocks at the foundations of each post. Deciduous trees run parallel to the fence. For the most part, the park has grassy lawns. Five granite markers, dating from 1876, denote the locations of key events in the Battle of Bunker Hill.

There are four gates on the avenue around Monument Square. These represent a different regiment that participated in the battle: the New Hampshire (north), Connecticut (east), Massachusetts (south), and United States (west) gates. Grand staircases ascend from each of the gates. Each staircase is divided into two to four flights of granite steps. The stair at the Massachusetts gate is the widest, while that at the New Hampshire gate is slightly smaller; the other two stairs are small, secondary entrances. The stairs have cast-iron handrails interspersed with posts containing triangular finials, along with granite monuments commemorating each gate's respective regiments. At the time of the completion of the Bunker Hill Monument obelisk, three gates led directly to streets extending perpendicularly off Monument Square's sides, each measuring 50 feet (15 m) wide. Monument Avenue, a 40-foot-wide (12 m) road extending southward from Monument Square, was built only after the obelisk was completed.

At the top of each staircase, concrete walkways connect with the obelisk at the monument's center. A circular asphalt path connects all four walkways, surrounding a platform containing the obelisk, an entrance building to the north, and a statue of Colonel William Prescott to the south.

== History ==
Before the park was built, the area was the site of the Battle of Bunker Hill. In June 1775, American patriots, having caught word of a British plan to fortify the Charlestown peninsula, decided to fortify it before the British could. After the American forces built a fortification on Breed's Hill, early on June 17, the British discovered the fortifications and set out to reclaim the peninsula. British soldiers sent troops to attack Breed's Hill; colonists held off the first two British attacks, but the third attack forced the rebels to retreat. The British won at great cost, having lost a significant amount of the officer corps stationed in America; the Americans lost 450 troops, while the British lost more than twice as many. The area surrounding Breed's Hill's summit was parceled up in the early 19th century. The site was likely owned by Sarah Russell and several other landowners. The first monument on the site was dedicated by the Grand Lodge of Massachusetts in 1794, honoring Joseph Warren, a lodge member who had died in the battle.

=== Creation and early years ===
The Bunker Hill battlefield was placed for sale at an auction in April 1822, attracting the notice of the businessman William Tudor. One of his acquaintances, the physician John Collins Warren, bought part of the site that November, constituting about 2 3/4 acres (1.1 ha). Subsequently, several figures formed the Bunker Hill Monument Association (BHMA), which was incorporated in 1823 to construct the Bunker Hill Monument obelisk. In its public communications, the BHMA extolled the site's topography and implied that the battlefield would be preserved as an open landscape. In February 1825, the General Court authorized the BHMA to acquire up to 15 acres (6.1 ha) on Breed's Hill. This area was soon acquired from ten landowners at approximately $1,550 per acre ($3,800/ha); (Note: Equivalent to $52,000 per acre or $127,000 per hectare in 2024) it did not include any of the Breed family's former holdings. Each landowner agreed to sell the BHMA their land at its appraised value, but one of the landowners subsequently demanded ten times the appraised amount of his site. To avoid delays, the association agreed to pay the inflated price. The BHMA also wanted to add Charlestown's nearby training field (now Winthrop Square) to its land holdings, but this never occurred for financial reasons.

In November 1825, workers began landscaping the site. When the BHMA ran out of money, the association reserved a 600-by-400-foot (180 by 120 m) plot around the obelisk and placed a mortgage on the remaining, non-reserved land. In 1831, the BHMA's officers passed stringent restrictions on the sale of land or material, but these were rescinded the next year. That June, the BHMA agreed to sell off the non-reserved land, anticipating that it could raise $25,000 (Note: Equivalent to $837,000 in 2024) by selling off 127,000 square feet (11,800 m^{2}). The BHMA planned to divide the land into 50 lots, and ultimately, the land was split into 115 lots. In 1838, the BHMA further reduced the north–south length of the reserved area from 600 to 417 feet (183 to 127 m), bringing the site to about 4 acres (1.6 ha). The reserved area was to be known as Monument Square, surrounded by a 50-foot-wide (15 m) road. After two extended delays, the Bunker Hill Monument was dedicated in 1843.

=== 1840s to 1890s ===
Landscaping continued for years after the obelisk's official dedication, although a small mound, likely part of the original fortification, remained intact. James S. Savage, who had completed the work on the obelisk, was hired to complete the landscaping around Monument Square Park. He added a brick sidewalk, fence, and trees at Monument Square's perimeter; a granite platform around the obelisk; and walkways and stairs leading to the sidewalk. Eight entrances were built—four at the corners and four on each side of Monument Square—and two concentric walkways were added as well. A 140-foot-tall (43 m) freestanding flagpole was added northeast of the obelisk in 1867, replacing a flagpole on the obelisk itself. During the early 1870s, the BHMA undertook landscape upgrades such as repairs to staircases; repaving of walkways around the obelisk; and regrading the slope of Monument Square Park. The original entrances at the corners of Monument Square were closed off, and visitors were redirected to the gates along each of the square's sides. Lampposts and drains were added as well. The association added two fountains south and west of the obelisk in 1871.

The BHMA commissioned granite markers in 1876, commemorating important events in the battle, and it installed a fence around the purported site of Warren's death that year. The avenue around Monument Square was resurfaced in concrete. The BHMA also planned to install seats and benches, which were delayed for a decade, and winding paths, which were never installed. The statue of Prescott was dedicated in 1881. The park's steps received iron handrails in 1887, and lamps and iron seating areas were added to Monument Square Park the next year. A wire fence was built around the obelisk's platform in 1889. That year, the Boston Common Council passed legislation requesting that Boston's mayor ask Massachusetts's governor to take over the monument. The city proposed installing commemorative tablets along Monument Square's perimeter sidewalk that year, prompting protests from the BHMA. Massachusetts state representative James E. Hayes proposed in 1893 that the state take over the monument and park, but state legislators rejected the proposal in 1897.

=== 1900s to 1940s ===
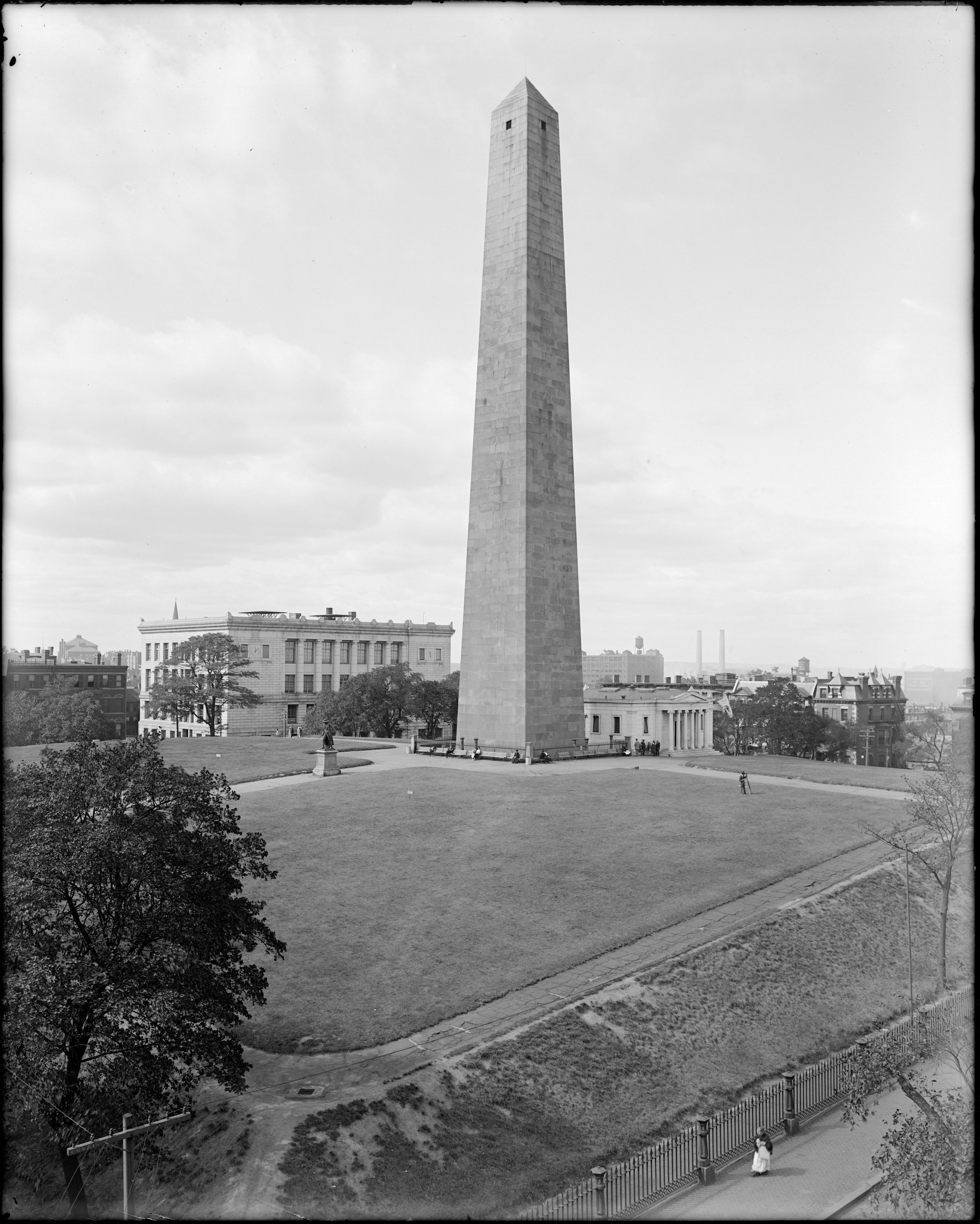
The obelisk photographed in 1920

The monument's granite entrance lodge opened in 1902. During the early 20th century, the BHMA's expenses continued to rise, while the grounds fell into disrepair. The architect Charles Allerton Coolidge surveyed the site in 1907, finding that the walkways were in bad condition and were redundant to each other, and that the fence surrounding the obelisk's platform was unattractive. After the BHMA voted in June 1919 to turn over operations to the state government, the monument and park were deeded to the government of Massachusetts that July. The Metropolitan District Commission (MDC) took over operation, establishing the Bunker Hill Reservation, which encompassed Monument Square Park.

Frederick Law Olmsted Jr. of the Olmsted Brothers landscape-design firm was hired to examine the site in 1919. Olmsted reported that the fences, steps, walkways, and obelisk needed repairs. The MDC recommended improving walkways and smoothening Monument Square's slope in a 1928 report, for which state funding was requested the next year. By then, state representative Charles S. Sullivan claimed the monument was being neglected. Arthur Asahel Shurcliff prepared plans for the landscape improvements, which also involved fence and staircase upgrades. Most of Shurcliff's proposals were not carried out, except for some landscape improvements such as a plaza and greenery at the obelisk's base. Although the federal Civilian Conservation Corps upgraded many MDC parks during the Great Depression, the corps did not perform work oat the site. Instead, the MDC spread out the landscape upgrades over two decades, having allocated $50,000 to the effort by 1934. (Note: Equivalent to $915,000 in 2024) The project was to be completed by 1939 but was delayed due to funding shortages. After World War II, the state legislature asked the MDC to study the feasibility of adding plaques for local World War II veterans; this elicited opposition from several groups, and the MDC ultimately rejected this plan. By 1947, the MDC had regraded the park's perimeter and relocated the walkway there.

=== 1950s to present ===
The federal government's Boston National Historic Sites Commission studied the site in 1956, finding that it had fallen into disrepair due to poor maintenance. The grounds were often used for active recreation, and newspapers reported on the site's poor condition. BHMA president Charles W. Eliot II attributed the degradation to a lack of nearby playgrounds. In 1961, the MDC sought $70,000 from the General Court for the grounds' restoration. (Note: Equivalent to $561,000 in 2024) The grounds underwent rehabilitation that year, including the installation of new sidewalks and fences. The MDC voted in 1968 to allow the federal government to take over the monument as a national historic site; the actual transfer process took several years. The monument became part of the newly-established Boston National Historical Park in 1974, though it remained under MDC control for two more years. During that period, the MDC and federal government jointly funded site improvements for the United States Bicentennial. The project included planting trees and repairing walkways, drainage, and lighting. Granite tablets were added to each of Monument Square's entrances.

When the NPS took over, the site had again deteriorated; modifications over the years, including fences, enclosures, and benches, were inconsistent with the original design. The Freedom Trail was extended to the site in 1977, and Thomas Mahlstedt began conducting the first archeological study of the site in 1980, while the obelisk was being renovated. The NPS completed a $100,000 renovation in the mid-1990s, which included trimming trees, repairing fences and steps, and conducting an archeological study of the battlefield. A car crashed into the New Hampshire gate in 1996, shortly after the renovation was finished. The crash caused $20,000 in damage, but the NPS struggled to raise money for repairs for two years, even after the driver's insurance company paid part of the repair cost. A new natural gas pipe was added in the late 1990s; to avoid disrupting archeological artifacts or ripping open the lawns, workers drilled the new pipe sideways from the street. Further archeological studies of the old Bunker Hill redoubt took place around the monument in 2026.
