= Bunker Hill Monument =

War memorial in Boston, Massachusetts

- U.S. National Register of Historic Places
- U.S. National Historic Landmark
- U.S. Historic district – Contributing property
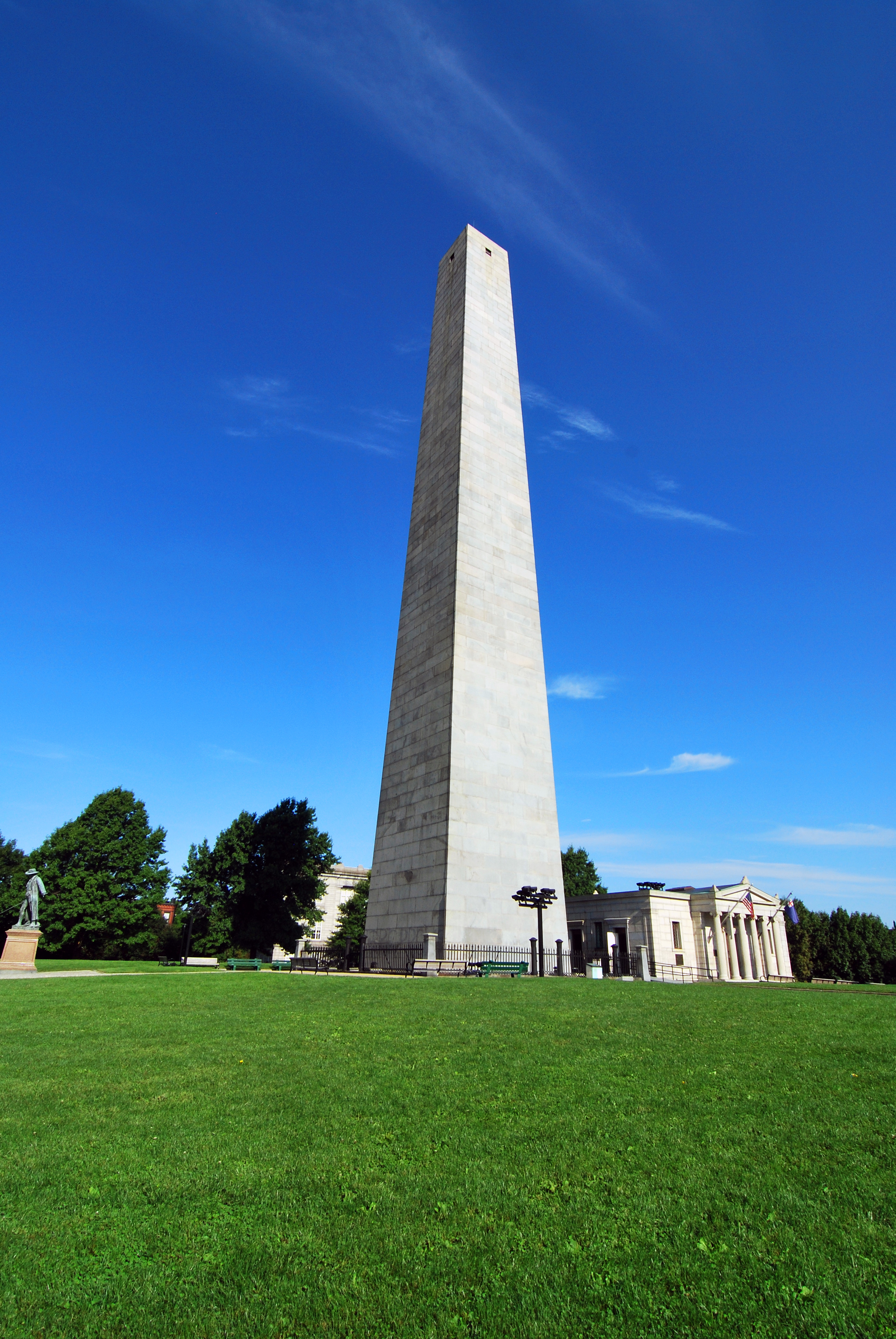

- Location within Boston Location within Massachusetts Location within the United States
- Interactive map of Bunker Hill Monument
- Location: Charlestown, Boston, Massachusetts, U.S.
- Coordinates: 42°22′34.9″N 71°3′38.8″W
- Area: 3.8 acres (1.5 ha) (Monument Square Park)
- Built: 1825–1843
- Architect: Solomon Willard
- Architectural style: Obelisk
- Part of: Monument Square Historic District (ID87001128); Boston National Historical Park (ID74002222)
- NRHP reference No.: 66000138

Significant dates
- Added to NRHP: October 15, 1966
- Designated NHL: January 20, 1961
- Designated CP: June 2, 1987 (Monument Square Historic District), October 26, 1974 (Boston National Historical Park)

The Bunker Hill Monument is a war memorial on Breed's Hill in the Charlestown neighborhood of Boston, Massachusetts, United States. It commemorates the Battle of Bunker Hill, a major American Revolutionary War battle that took place there on June 17, 1775. The monument primarily consists of a 221-foot-tall (67 m) granite obelisk at the center of Monument Square Park, within the Monument Square Historic District. The obelisk was designed by Solomon Willard and erected between 1825 and 1843. It is flanked by William Wetmore Story's statue of William Prescott to the south and an entrance building to the north. Designated as a National Historic Landmark, the Bunker Hill Monument is part of the Freedom Trail and Boston National Historical Park.

The first monument at the site was dedicated in 1794 and honored American soldier Joseph Warren, who was killed in the battle. After the site was placed for sale in 1822, the Bunker Hill Monument Association (BHMA) was formed to acquire and preserve the site. Willard took over the design from Loammi Baldwin Jr., who drew up the original specifications based on a design that Horatio Greenough submitted for a design competition. The cornerstone was laid in 1825, but due to insufficient funds, work was halted twice for extended periods between 1829 and 1840. The monument was dedicated on June 17, 1843.

When completed, the Bunker Hill Monument was the United States' largest obelisk. The monument has required ongoing maintenance through the years. A temporary wooden entrance building was built in 1857, and the Prescott sculpture was added in 1881. Following decades of fundraising, a granite entrance building was completed in 1902. The BHMA maintained the monument until 1919, when Massachusetts's Metropolitan District Commission (MDC) took over. The monument has been owned and managed by the National Park Service since 1976.

== Site ==
The Bunker Hill Monument is located in the Monument Square area of Charlestown (since 1874, part of Boston) in Massachusetts, United States. It is built atop a Continental Army fortification on the summit of Breed's Hill, where the Battle of Bunker Hill took place in 1775, during the American Revolutionary War.

The monument occupies a square, 4-acre (1.6 ha) (Note: The park's grounds include 3.8 acres (1.5 ha) within the perimeter fence. The surrounding streets and sidewalks bring the parcel to 6.12 acres (2.48 ha).) park named Monument Square, surrounded by an avenue also named Monument Square. An iron fence runs along Monument Square Park's perimeter, and five granite markers, dating from 1876, denote the locations of key events in the Battle of Bunker Hill. There are four gates on the avenue around Monument Square, which represent a different regiment that participated in the battle; each gate connects to a staircase ascending to the park. At the top of each staircase, concrete walkways connect with the obelisk at the monument's center. A circular asphalt path connects the walkways, surrounding a platform containing the obelisk, an entrance building to the north, and a statue of Colonel William Prescott to the south. The Bunker Hill Monument is a stop on the Freedom Trail, a path connecting historic sites in Boston; sequentially, it is the last stop after the USS Constitution.

=== Breed's Hill ===
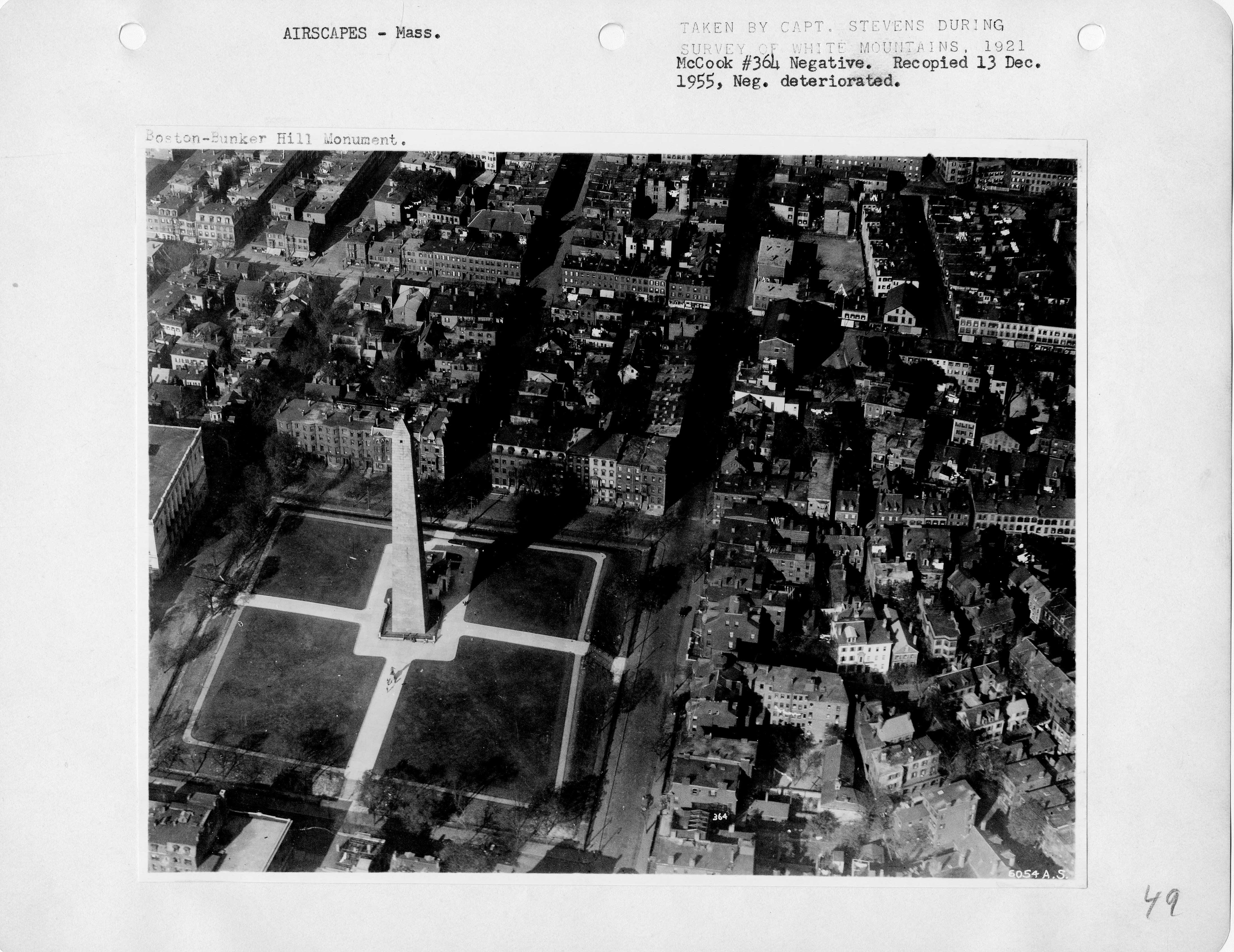
Aerial view of the monument site, looking north toward the obelisk

Breed's Hill is a 62-foot-high (19 m) glacial drumlin in the southern portion of the Charlestown Peninsula, created 12,000 years ago by retreating glaciers. After the area was colonized by the English in 1625, Breed's Hill was named for the Breed family, early settlers who owned land on the hill's eastern slope. The hill was originally connected to the mainland portion of Charlestown (now the separate city of Somerville) in colonial times by a short, narrow isthmus known as the Charlestown Neck. In the 19th and early 20th centuries the peninsula's shape and connections to other landforms were significantly altered, with the waters of the Charles River between Cambridge and Charlestown heavily filled in. By the American Revolution, the south slope of Breed's Hill had a road leading westward.

The portion of the hill within Monument Square Park slopes fairly steeply. The buildings along the avenue surrounding Monument Square are mostly three-to-four-story houses, designed in the Greek Revival, Italianate, and Second Empire styles starting in the 1840s. The Charlestown High School and the former Charlestown Library are also located on the avenue. The designs of these buildings are influenced by deed restrictions, including a mandatory setback from the street, intended to preserve the area's character. The Bunker Hill Museum, preserving artifacts from the battle, is located within the Charlestown Library. The monument is about 700 yards (640 m) from Bunker Hill, which is situated to the north. Bunker Hill is slightly higher than Breed's Hill, at 110 feet (34 m), and is topped by the St. Francis de Sales Church; sources sometimes considered Breed's Hill part of Bunker Hill. Approximately 1/4 mile (0.40 km) to the southeast is the Charlestown Navy Yard.

== Description ==
The obelisk, entrance building, and Prescott statue are located at the center of Monument Square Park. They are surrounded by a north–south concrete platform, which is constructed of rectangular and triangular slabs. An iron fence surrounds the base of the obelisk itself, running between granite piers diagonally opposite each of the obelisk's corners. The fence has posts topped by caps and finials, and the cross-bars have Greek crosses at the bottom and inverted scallop designs at the top. Brick footings are placed under the platform, while curbstone is installed under the obelisk fence.

=== Obelisk ===
The main structure of Bunker Hill Monument is an obelisk designed by Solomon Willard, made of 6,700 short tons (6,000 long tons; 6,100 t) of granite. It occupies the southeastern corner of the redoubt constructed during the Battle of Bunker Hill. The obelisk rises 221 feet (67 m) from its base; (Note: Some sources give a different height of 220 feet (67 m). The National Park Service cites a more precise height of 221 feet 5 inches (67.49 m). The historian E. H. Cameron writes that the 220-foot figure is given by sources that cite a report by Loammi Baldwin predating the obelisk's construction, while the 221-foot figure is given by later sources.) this was the maximum height its sponsor, the Bunker Hill Monument Association, could afford.

==== Exterior ====
The foundation, measuring 12 feet (3.7 m) deep and 50 by 50 feet (15 by 15 m) across, is built of six courses (or horizontal layers) of granite. At the base, the obelisk has a square footprint measuring about 30 by 30 feet (9.1 by 9.1 m) across, which tapers to 15 by 15 feet (4.6 by 4.6 m) near the top of the shaft. The shaft's granite is laid horizontally into 78 courses, each measuring 2 2/3 feet (0.81 m) tall. The exterior wall has a surface area of 27,500 square feet (2,550 m^{2}), and its thickness ranges from 6 feet (1.8 m) at the bottom to 2 feet (0.61 m) at the top. There are narrow windows on the northern elevation at regular intervals, and the top of each elevation has a single square window. Several 150-watt (0.20 hp) lamps illuminate the exterior at night.

The shaft is topped by a 12-foot-tall (3.7 m) tall pyramidal section with another five courses of granite. (Note: The NPS cites a figure of six courses, including the pyramidion.) Above the topmost course is a pyramidion, a capstone shaped like a four-sided pyramid. The pyramidion measures 3.5 feet (1.1 m) high, and its pinnacle's faces are sloped at 90-degree angles from each other.

==== Interior ====
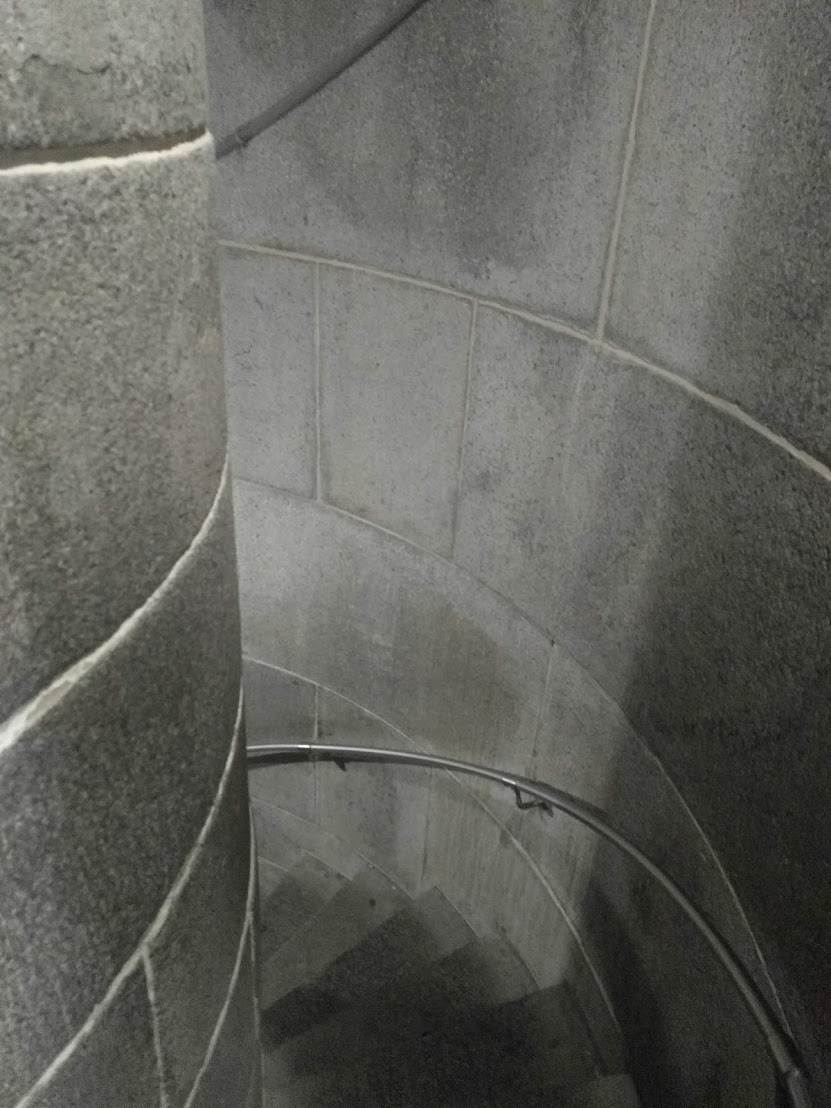
Interior of the staircase

Inside the obelisk is a hollow cylindrical shaft, reached from the entrance building to the north. The shaft measures 18 feet (5.5 m) across at the base. In the 20th century, a 9-foot-tall (2.7 m) marble replica of an earlier memorial on the same site—commemorating Joseph Warren, an American soldier killed in the battle—had stood inside the obelisk. A spiral staircase ascends through the shaft, with 294 steps. (Note: Sources frequently cite a figure of 294 steps, but a figure of 295 steps has also been given.) The number of steps above ground level is painted at intervals of 25 steps. The staircase wraps around a hollow central cone, also known as the newel, which is used for ventilation. The cone, which exists to provide additional structural support to the staircase, measures 196 3/4 feet (60.0 m) tall. Its walls measure 2 feet (0.61 m) thick and have 147 courses each measuring 1 1/3 feet (0.41 m) tall.

The obelisk is not accessible above ground level. Historian and engineer E. H. Cameron wrote in 1953 that the cone's presence left insufficient space for an elevator, while Susan Wilson stated in 2004 that a steam-powered elevator was briefly used by passengers before being removed. The narrow openings on the obelisk's northern elevation illuminate the staircase, with window ledges that are covered with mesh. Atop the obelisk is a square observation room measuring 11 feet (3.4 m) across and 17 feet (5.2 m) high. Two cannons salvaged from the battle were displayed in the room in the 19th and early 20th centuries; one of them was later moved to the entrance building, while the other was moved to the Minute Man National Historical Park. The interior, intended to fit no more than 50 people, was frequently overcrowded after the obelisk's completion.

=== Bunker Hill Lodge ===
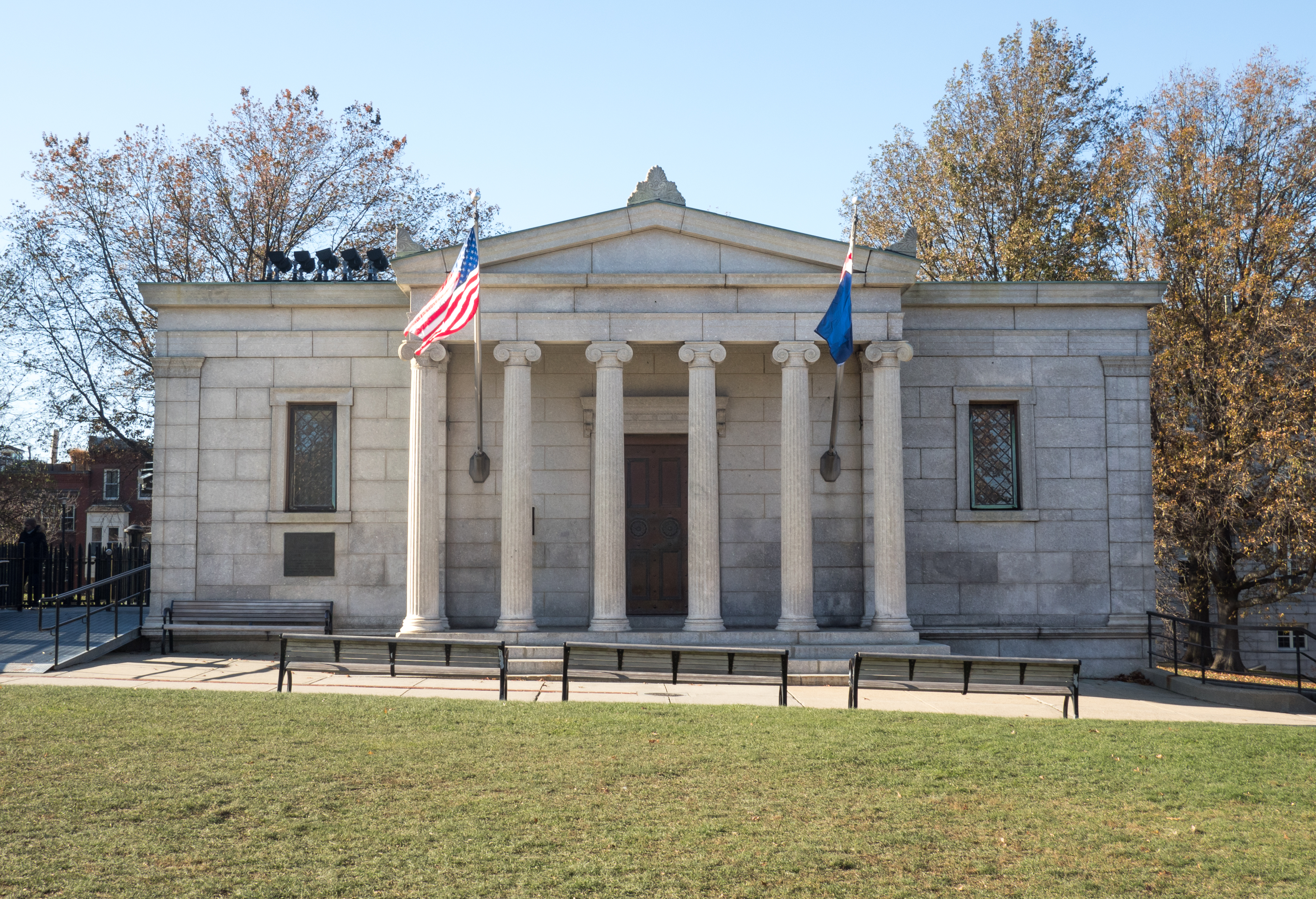
The Bunker Hill Lodge near the obelisk

The entrance building, known as the Bunker Hill Lodge, is made of granite blocks and dates from 1902. It is a one-story neoclassical building with a rectangular grid of three by four bays, measuring 50 by 38 feet (15 by 12 m) across and 19 feet (5.8 m) tall. (Note: One source cites the floor plan as measuring 50 by 48 feet (15 by 15 m).) The facade is made of gray Deer Isle granite. The eastern elevation has an Ionic-style portico, which supports a pediment with a carved lintel. Beneath the portico are stairs leading to an elaborate cast iron door with two rosettes. The northern and southern elevations also have smaller entrances, including a ramp leading inside. The rest of the facade has casement windows with slightly-protruding rectangular window frames, and the corners have pilasters with undecorated capitals. The entablature just below the roofline has egg and dart decorations. During the 20th century, a sign describing the battle was affixed to the exterior.

Inside the Bunker Hill Lodge is an entrance vestibule, a central room (sometimes known as the rotunda), and a pair of smaller spaces flanking the rotunda. The vestibule's floor is made of multicolored marble mosaic tiles arranged into various patterns, while its plaster vaulted ceiling has a central octagonal medallion. The rotunda is at the northwestern corner and measures 12 by 12 feet (3.7 by 3.7 m) across, with a mosaic-tiled floor. The rotunda's Siena-marble walls support a plaster ceiling dome with coffers. Henry Dexter's large statue of Warren, built for an earlier entrance building in 1857, stands in the rotunda. Leading off the rotunda to the north and south are 11-by-12-foot (3.4 m × 3.7 m) rooms, which originally served as men's and women's lounges, respectively.

=== Prescott statue ===
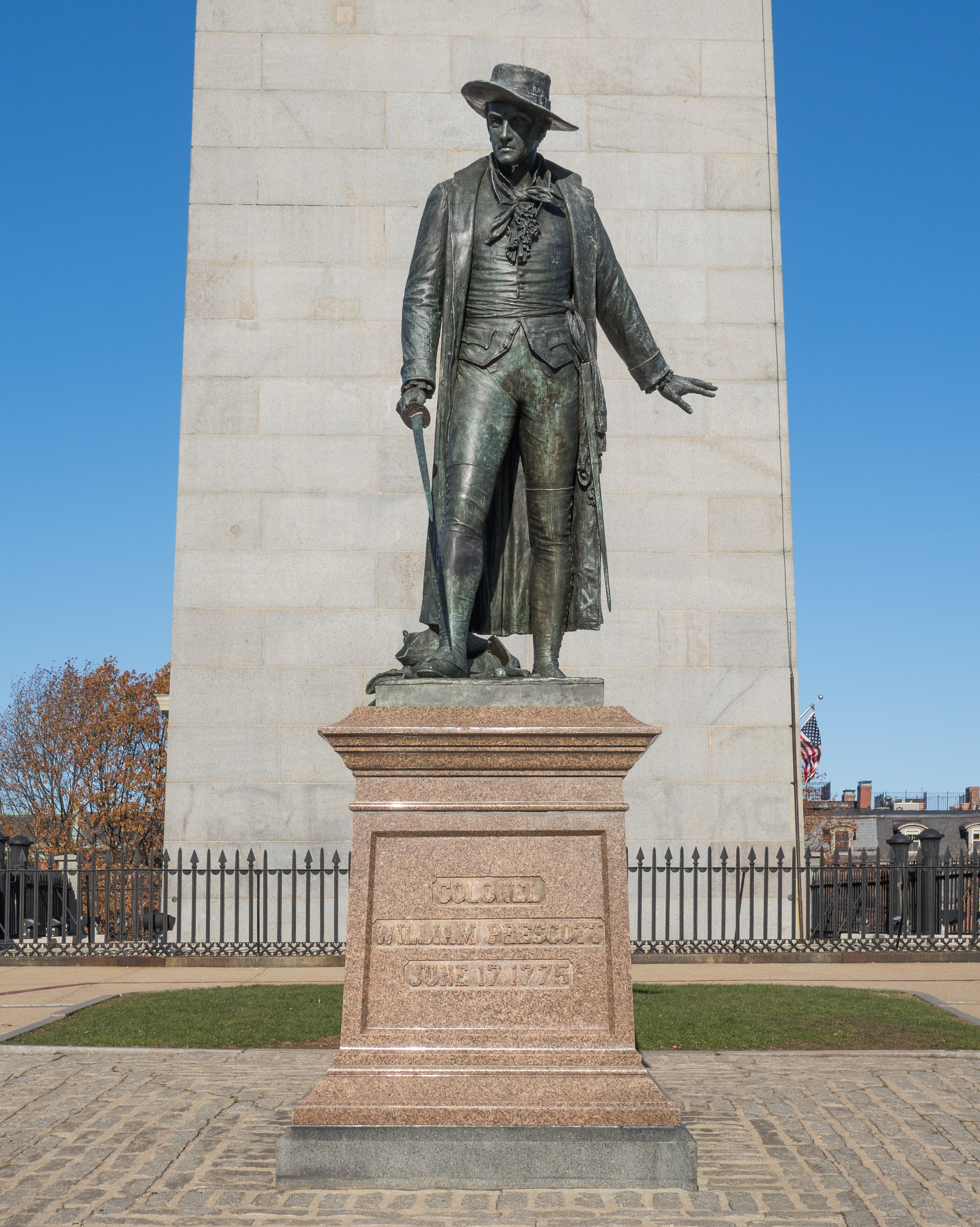
The Prescott statue, with inscription at the podium

The bronze William Prescott statue, south of the obelisk, was sculpted by William Wetmore Story in 1880–1881. The sculpture is raised on a granite pedestal with the inscription "Colonel William Prescott; June 17, 1775". This pedestal also contains other panels, which are left blank. The sculpture itself stands about 8 feet (2.4 m) or 9 feet (2.7 m) tall. The statue depicts Prescott with his right leg advancing and his right hand grasping a sword, while his left hand is extended backward. The pose reportedly depicted his appearance as he told his men, "Don't fire until you see the whites of their eyes". Prescott is sometimes credited with having first said this phrase during this battle; the phrase is variously also attributed to Israel Putnam, John Stark, or Richard Gridley, though in actuality, none of them originated it. The statue also has a broad-brimmed hat and a loose coat, and there are a shovel and pickaxe near its feet.

== Development ==
=== Background ===
==== Battle ====
In June 1775, American patriots, having caught word of a British plan to fortify the Charlestown peninsula, decided to fortify it before the British could. On June 16, under the leadership of General Israel Putnam and Colonel William Prescott, the Americans stole out onto the Charlestown Peninsula to establish defensive positions on the hills overlooking Boston. Prescott originally intended to build a redoubt, or defensive fortification, on Bunker Hill, but the redoubt was instead constructed on the nearby Breed's Hill, which was lower and was closer to Boston. Early on June 17, the British discovered the fortifications and set out to reclaim the peninsula. British soldiers under General William Howe sent troops to attack Breed's Hill; colonists held off the first two British attacks, but the third attack forced the rebels to retreat.

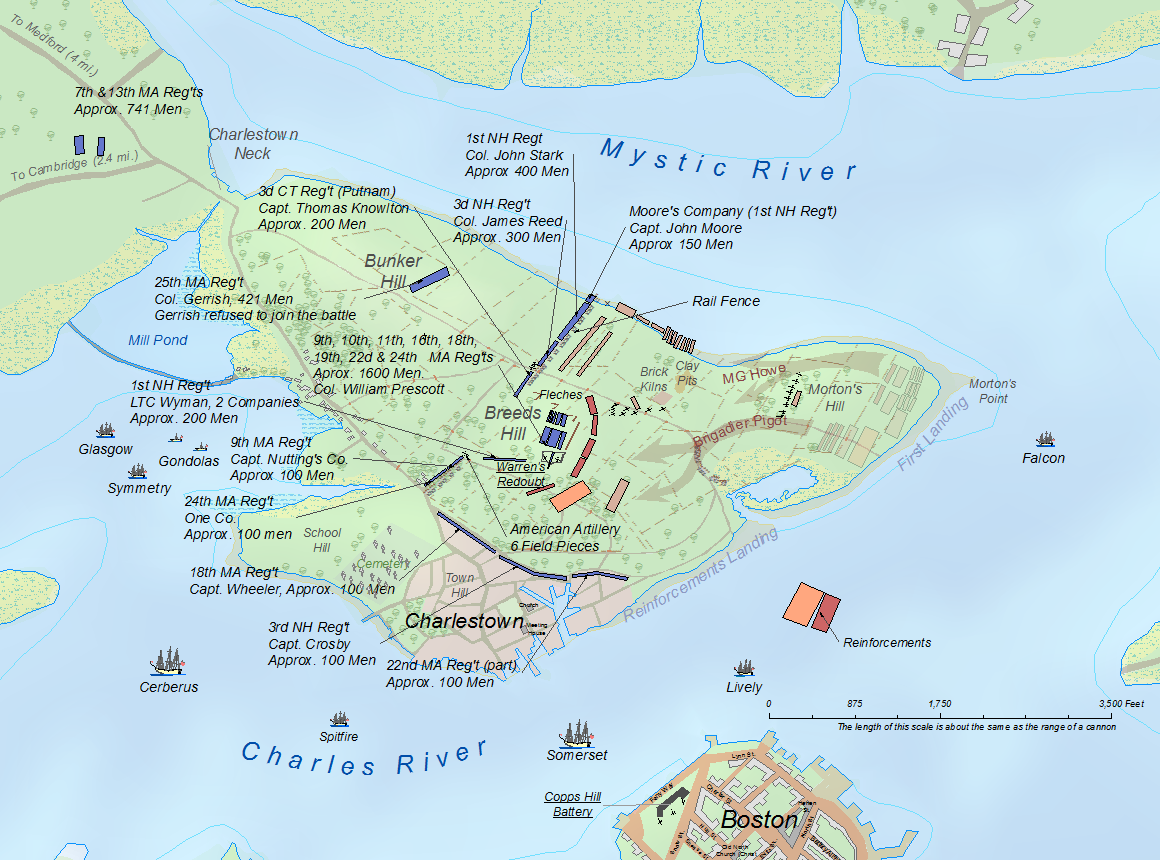
A map of the Battle of Bunker Hill

The British won at great cost, having lost a significant amount of the officer corps stationed in America. On the American side, 450 were killed or wounded, including Joseph Warren, to whom a memorial was later built on the site. (Prescott, who would later be memorialized as well, survived the battle.) The British recorded more than twice as many casualties, at 1,054. The dead were buried where they lay. While many corpses were reclaimed by families of the deceased, a 2009 news report stated that mass graves could still exist under gardens around Monument Square. The British strengthened the fortifications on the hill before evacuating Boston in March 1776. The area surrounding Breed's Hill's summit was parceled up in the early 19th century. The site of the Bunker Hill Monument was likely owned by Sarah Russell and several other landowners.

==== Early commemoration attempts ====
The Battle of Bunker Hill's anniversary was not commemorated during the ongoing war. The Grand Lodge of Massachusetts constructed the first monument commemorating the battle to honor Warren, who had been one of their members. The Warren memorial, delayed due to a lack of money, was dedicated on December 2, 1794. It was an 18-foot (5.5 m) wooden column designed in the Tuscan order, standing on a brick pedestal measuring 10 feet (3.0 m) tall and 8 by 8 feet (2.4 by 2.4 m) across. This pillar, which stood near where Warren was believed to have died, was surrounded with a fence c. 1796. The Warren memorial remained in place until 1825.

The Charlestown Artillery hosted its first parade memorializing the battle in 1794, and further such parades took place in the early 19th century. Several paintings honoring the battle were also commissioned in the late 18th and early 19th centuries. After Henry Dearborn published a book about the battle in 1818, controversies regarding the book's accuracy (and particularly his criticisms of Putnam's role) rekindled interest in the topic. Interest in a permanent monument may have been inspired by an 1817 visit to the battlefield by President James Madison.

=== Origins, early fundraising, and land acquisition ===
The Bunker Hill battlefield was placed for sale at an auction in April 1822. This attracted the notice of the businessman William Tudor, who is often credited with devising the idea for the monument. One of his acquaintances, the physician John Collins Warren, bought part of the site that November, constituting about 2 3/4 acres (1.1 ha). Subsequently, several men—including Warren, Tudor, Daniel Webster, George Ticknor, William Sullivan, and George Blake—met at the house of Thomas Handasyd Perkins to discuss plans for a monument. On May 10, 1823, the group called their first meeting at Boston's Merchants Exchange. About two dozen attendees formed the Bunker Hill Monument Association (BHMA). Massachusetts Governor William Eustis signed an act on June 7, 1823, allowing the BHMA to formally organize as a private corporation. Eustis's immediate predecessor, John Brooks, was the organization's first president. Only men could become members; women were not given membership until 1936. During its inaugural year, the BHMA mainly focused on administrative matters, forming the Standing Committee to oversee its operations. The new organization also collected Revolutionary-era artifacts, particularly those related to the Battle of Bunker Hill; in so doing, they obtained the Washington Benevolent Society's entire collection.

The BHMA began soliciting donations from the public in mid-1824. The association's director offered honorary memberships to those who donated at least $5, (Note: Equivalent to $168 in 2025) and the BHMA distributed flyers throughout New England, asking for donations. In its public communications, the BHMA extolled the site's topography and implied that the battlefield would be preserved as an open landscape. In July 1824, the BHMA appointed a group to oversee preparations for a cornerstone-laying ceremony. The association invited the Marquis de Lafayette (who was touring the United States for the war's 50th anniversary) to the monument site that August. He agreed to donate funds and speak at the cornerstone-laying ceremony; his involvement, along with regular newspaper reports on the progress of the fundraiser, increased public interest in the monument. In a letter that October, the BHMA's directors suggested that $75,000 be raised. (Note: Equivalent to $2,687,000 in 2025) Early in 1825, Eustis suggested to the Massachusetts General Court, the state legislature, that the state government take over the obelisk following its completion. These suggestions were discarded when he died shortly afterward.

In February 1825, the General Court authorized the BHMA to acquire up to $10,000 of stone hammered at the state prison. (Note: Equivalent to $343,000 in 2025) The same legislation also allowed the organization to acquire up to 15 acres (6.1 ha) on Breed's Hill. This area was soon acquired from ten landowners at approximately $1,550 per acre ($3,800/ha); (Note: Equivalent to $53,000 per acre or $130,000 per hectare in 2025) it did not include any of the Breed family's former holdings. Each landowner agreed to sell the BHMA their land at its appraised value, but one of the landowners subsequently demanded ten times the appraised amount of his site. To avoid delays, the association agreed to pay the inflated price. The BHMA also wanted to add Charlestown's nearby training field (now Winthrop Square) to its land holdings, but this never occurred for financial reasons. About 2,500 donors had given between $5 and $500 each by April 1825. (Note: Equivalent to $170–17,150 in 2025)

=== Design and cornerstone laying ===
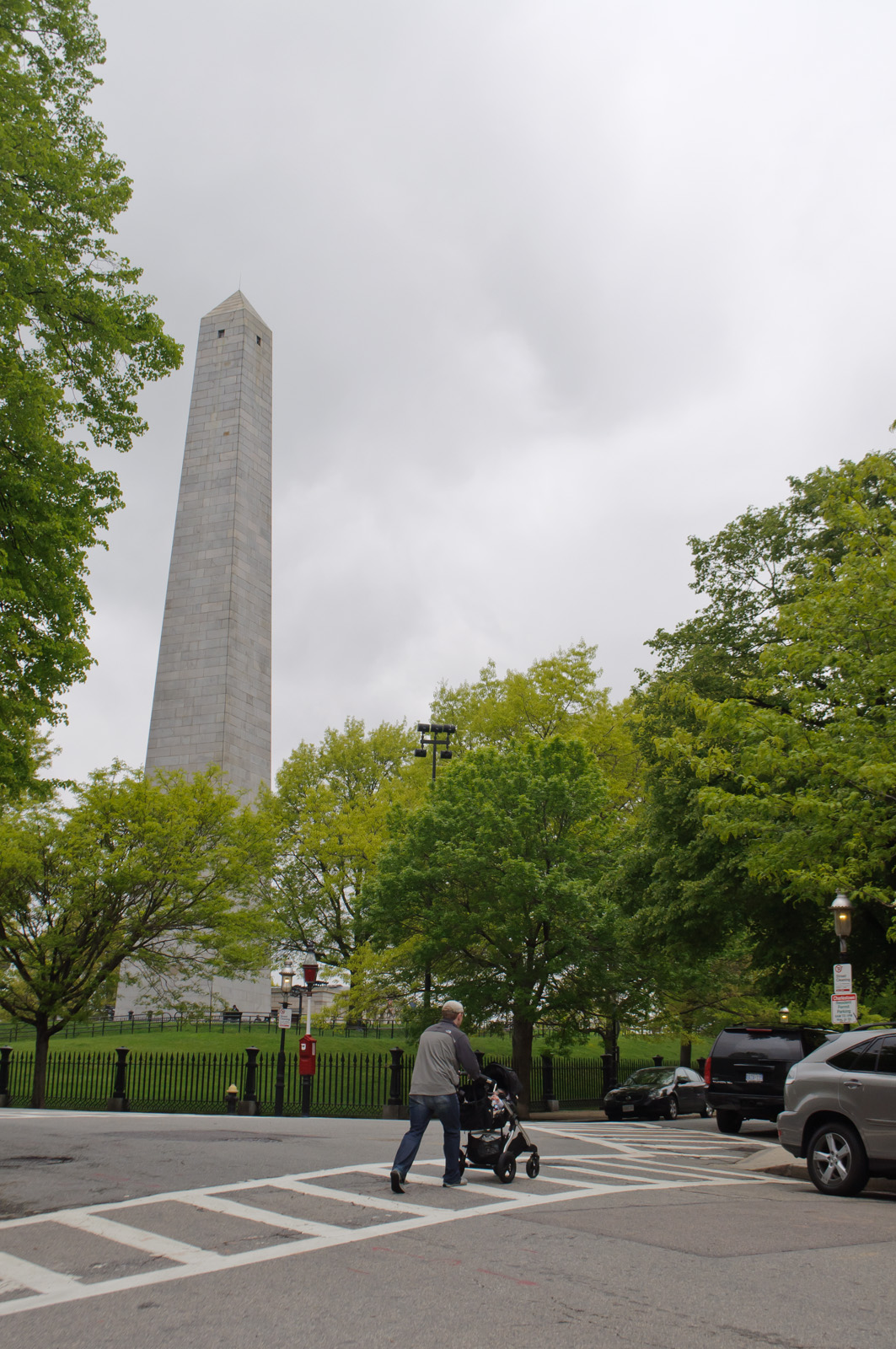
The obelisk as seen from the street

The BHMA wanted a structure with a design connoting heroism. Solomon Willard was appointed in late 1824 to devise plans for a column. The BHMA resolved to raise $37,000 for the construction of Willard's design, (Note: Equivalent to $1,269,000 in 2025) which Dearborn wrongly believed would be taller than any other commemorative column worldwide. In January 1825, the BHMA decided to host an architectural design competition for the monument, publishing specifications for the monument in local newspapers, and Willard withdrew his plans. The first design committee consisted of Webster, the engineer Loammi Baldwin Jr., George Ticknor, Gilbert Stuart, and Washington Allston. The committee offered $100 for the best design. (Note: Equivalent to $3,000 in 2025) It received 50 formal submissions mailed from as far away as South Carolina. Several plans were submitted after the April 1 deadline, including alternatives such as a Gothic church, but were not considered. Although the committee preferred designs for a column, Robert Mills and Horatio Greenough also submitted designs for obelisks. Greenough's design consisted of an obelisk with statuary at the base and plain surfaces elsewhere, while Mills's design was more ornate. Debate arose over whether an obelisk or a column should be used. At the time, obelisks were frequently used at graves, whereas columns were affiliated with heroism.

The BHMA committee, in late April, suggested that Greenough receive the $100 award. On May 19, the association narrowed down the choices to a column and an obelisk, and another committee was appointed to procure designs and tentative budgets for both. At a vote on June 7, the committee voted 11–5 in favor of an obelisk, having considered an obelisk more imposing and appropriate for the site. Baldwin, who sat on the board of artists, was tasked with drawing specifications for Greenough's design. Dearborn wrote a letter advocating for a column, which he said would cost $58,500, (Note: Equivalent to $2,007,000 in 2025) while Willard claimed that an obelisk would cost only $37,000. The final design was adopted July 5, when Baldwin recommended a plan costing $100,000. (Note: Equivalent to $3,430,000 in 2025) Baldwin's design deviated from Greenough's original proposal, which had called for a 100-foot-tall (30 m) obelisk atop an elevated platform, with buttresses at the corner. Baldwin's plan was austere and sparsely decorated, measuring 220 feet (67 m) tall and 30 by 30 feet (9.1 m × 9.1 m) across at the base, with the obelisk's faces oriented with the cardinal directions. The BHMA also considered installing statues of soldiers who fought at Bunker Hill but ultimately decided against it.

Meanwhile, the BHMA procured a cornerstone with inscriptions and artifacts relating to the battle. The organization also wanted to invite as many Revolutionary War veterans as possible. The cornerstone was laid on June 17, 1825, the battle's 50th anniversary, at the center of the proposed site. More than 100,000 attended the event, which included a parade and much fanfare. The attendees included 190 Revolutionary War veterans, (Note: These included 40 veterans of the battle itself, though one source cited the 190 soldiers as being Bunker Hill veterans. Another source described the procession as having 200 total veterans.) hailing from across Massachusetts and the Eastern United States. They marched from the Massachusetts State House to Breed's Hill, where Daniel Webster addressed the audience; he sold the copyright to his speech for $600 (Note: Equivalent to $21,000 in 2025) to help fund construction. Lafayette, who performed the ceremony, received a piece of the Warren monument from the Grand Lodge of Massachusetts. In recognition of the Grand Lodge's commemoration efforts, the BHMA invited the fraternity's Grand Master to conduct the services. Rev. Joseph Thaxter, who had been a Continental Army chaplain during the battle, officiated as chaplain. The artifacts were later moved to a new cornerstone at the obelisk's northeastern corner.

=== Obelisk construction ===
==== Initial progress ====
A group of five men, including Baldwin, were appointed to a construction committee on July 12, 1825. By that September, the BHMA had raised $54,433.07 (Note: Equivalent to $1,867,000 in 2025)—more than half the $100,000 construction cost—and its directors voted to begin construction. Baldwin resigned not long afterward, and Willard was rehired that October to carry out the design. Willard refused to be paid more than a small salary, and he also agreed to donate $1,000 for the obelisk's construction. (Note: Equivalent to $34,000 in 2025) James S. Savage was hired to construct the monument. The BHMA had raised $64,010.55 before construction started. (Note: Equivalent to $2,196,000 in 2025) Only about half this amount could be used for the obelisk itself; the remainder was allocated toward land acquisition and other matters.

Before construction formally commenced, Willard visited various quarries to examine granite, reportedly walking 300 miles (480 km) in doing so. In November 1825, workers began landscaping the site, and the BHMA decided to obtain granite from Quincy, Massachusetts, a southern suburb of Boston. The BHMA paid Gridley Bryant $325 for the right to quarry the granite (Note: Equivalent to $11,000 in 2025) from an outcropping that became known as the Bunker Hill Ledge. By quarrying its own granite, the BHMA saved an estimated $60,000 in construction costs; (Note: Equivalent to $2,058,000 in 2025) it could spend $5.40 per cubic yard ($7.06/m^{3}), while a typical quarry would have charged $24.30 per cubic yard ($31.78/m^{3}). To save additional money, the BHMA used larger granite blocks, which required fewer stones. The granite blocks, averaging two cubic yards (1.5 m^{3}) each, were quarried by wedging and were then dressed and trimmed to fit the obelisk. The foundation was being constructed by 1826.

The Granite Railway—a broad-gauge, horse-drawn railway from Quincy—was constructed to transport the granite blocks. (Note: Although contemporary sources described the Granite Railway as the United States' first railway, several others had preceded it.) Although the railway became operational on October 7, 1826, a contract to transport the granite was not signed until early 1827. The foundation was completed that July. Since the Granite Railway ran only to the Neponset River waterfront in Quincy, the blocks had to be transferred to barges, then transferred again in Charlestown. To carry the blocks up approximately 84 feet (26 m), an inclined railway was built in Charlestown, ascending to the obelisk's southeastern corner. Within one year, the Granite Railway had transported 3,000 short tons (2,700 long tons; 2,700 t) of granite. The repeated transfers damaged the blocks and caused delays, and in 1828 the BHMA decided to have oxen transport the granite directly to Breed's Hill.

==== Monetary issues and delays ====
Twice during construction, the BHMA ran out of money to complete the obelisk; consequently, construction was suspended for a combined ten years. The first time was in 1828, when the BHMA obtained various loans in a futile attempt to keep the project solvent. The association reserved a 600-by-400-foot (180 by 120 m) plot around the obelisk and placed a mortgage on the remaining, non-reserved land. In January 1829, work was suspended after the loans were depleted. Although $56,525.19 had been spent on construction to date, (Note: Equivalent to $1,924,000 in 2025) most of these expenses had been allocated to the foundation. Fourteen courses of granite had been laid, bringing the obelisk to a height of about 38 feet (12 m), and there was enough stone to build another 18 feet (5.5 m). A temporary roof was built atop the completed section of the obelisk. The BHMA unsuccessfully asked the General Court for permission to raise money through a lottery. The group also solicited subscriptions from Boston residents and appealed to women's groups in New England. The women's groups raised $2,000, (Note: Equivalent to $68,000 in 2025) as each woman and child could contribute only $1 to that effort. (Note: Equivalent to $34 in 2025)

In 1831, the BHMA's officers passed stringent restrictions on the sale of land or material, but these were rescinded the next year. The association also made personal appeals to numerous wealthy Bostonians, to little avail, while donations from the general public had slowed considerably. In April 1833, the philanthropist Amos Lawrence appealed to the Massachusetts Charitable Mechanic Association for funds, but nothing came of this proposal, despite sizable support for it. By that year, the association's debts totaled $30,000. (Note: Equivalent to $1,032,000 in 2025) The association planned to sell the plots around the obelisk, and it formed a committee, which suggested reducing the obelisk's height to save money. That June, the BHMA agreed to sell off the non-reserved land, anticipating that it could raise $25,000 (Note: Equivalent to $860,000 in 2025) by selling off 127,000 square feet (11,800 m^{2}). The land was thus split into 115 lots. The association also agreed to shorten the obelisk to 159.5 feet (48.6 m), and its officers rehired Willard in June 1834 to oversee the design.

Work continued until November 1835, when funding shortages stopped construction again. During this time, $20,000–23,000 was raised for the project; the Ladies' Fund raised about $3,000, while the remainder was raised by the Mechanic Association. Nearly the entire amount was spent on the newly-built portion of the obelisk, which had reached 80 feet (24 m) when funds were depleted. (Note: A figure of 82 feet (25 m) is also given. Another source cites a figure of 85 feet (26 m), with 32 courses having been built.) In 1838, the BHMA further reduced the north–south length of its reserved area from 600 to 417 feet (183 to 127 m), bringing the site to about 4 acres (1.6 ha). After the remaining two-thirds of the original site was sold in September 1839, the BHMA not only paid off its entire debt but also recorded a $1,767.57 surplus. (Note: Equivalent to $52,000 in 2025) Excess soil from Monument Square's western and eastern slopes was relocated to the square's northern boundary, filling in a depression there.

==== Completion ====
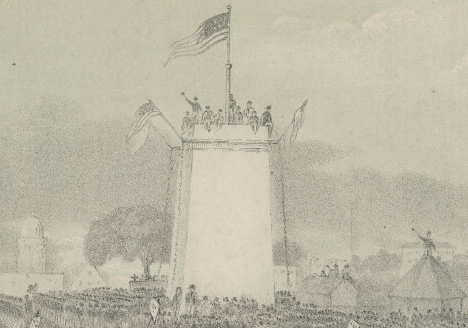
Construction progress as of 1840

In 1839, Lawrence and Judah Touro each pledged $10,000 to match local contributions to spur the monument's completion. The terms of the men's gifts required private donors to raise an additional $25,000 or $30,000. (Note: Equivalent to $781,000–937,000 in 2025) Touro made his gift on the condition that he remain anonymous, but his name was subsequently divulged anyway. A subscription drive to raise the necessary funds was not carried out. By June 1840, the BHMA's directors were doubtful that there would ever be sufficient funds. In response, a local ladies' group suggested hosting a fundraising fair.

Several women, including Ladies' Magazine editor Sarah Josepha Hale, formed a committee to organize the fundraiser, setting up the Ladies' Fair at Quincy Market in Downtown Boston. The fair ran for seven days in September 1840, coinciding with a Whig Party convention. The items for sale included handmade goods, pastries baked by women across the U.S., models of the monument, and kisses from the socialite Eliza Henderson Boardman Otis. The Ladies' Fair raised $30,035.53. (Note: Equivalent to $938,000 in 2025) These profits were combined with additional funds from Lawrence, Touro, and private donors, including $800 and real estate from the Mechanics' Association. (Note: Equivalent to $25,000 in 2025) In total, these efforts raised $55,153.27 for the project. (Note: Equivalent to $1,722,000 in 2025)

With sufficient funding secured, the BHMA's directors voted to build the obelisk to its original 220-foot height, and a new construction committee was appointed. James S. Savage was hired to complete the construction, and work resumed in May 1841. Savage devised a steam-powered derrick with a specialized movable boom, which hoisted the granite blocks to the shaft's upper levels; this significantly expedited construction. The pyramidion was laid on July 23, 1842, when a crowd watched a derrick raise the capstone to the top for 16 minutes. The monument was dedicated on June 17, 1843, again with an oration by Daniel Webster and a large parade. President John Tyler and every state governor were invited to the dedication, and Tyler attended with his cabinet and 13 battle survivors. In total, the monument is cited as having cost $102,000 or $120,000. (Note: Equivalent to $3,537,000–4,161,000 in 2025) A replica of the original Warren monument was dedicated at the obelisk the following week, June 24.

== Management and operational history ==
=== BHMA operation ===
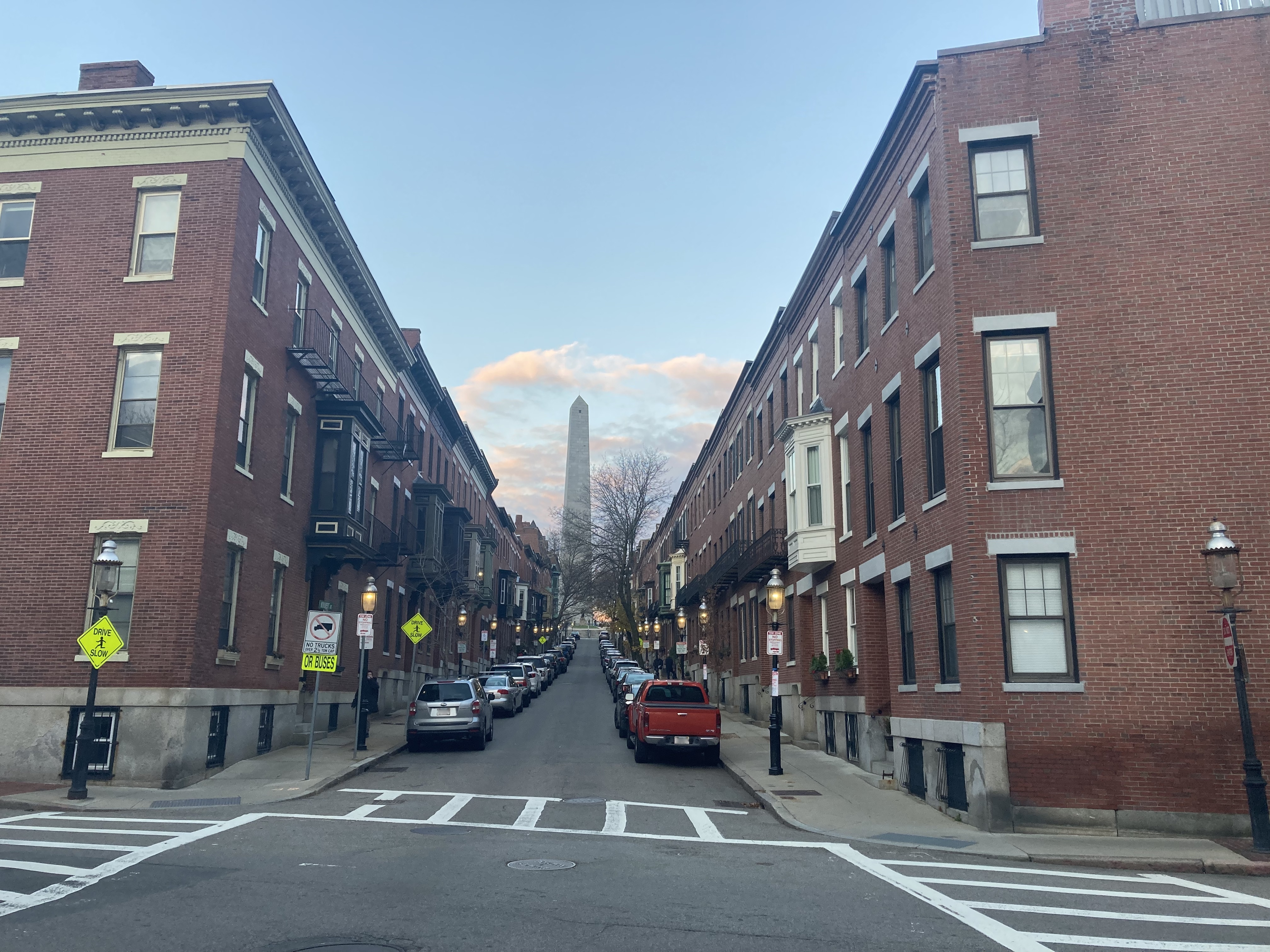
View of the obelisk from a distance, seen along Monument Street

When the monument opened, the BHMA charged admission for the climb, but many visitors hesitated to pay the fee. The association also raised money through donations. The monument had a guestbook, whose signatories included King Edward VII of Britain and the future British prime minister Winston Churchill. The monument hosted Bunker Hill Day commemorations on June 17 each year, a day known as the "glorious seventeenth". Bunker Hill Day, originally a solemn commemoration, evolved over time into a festive event. American flags were displayed in the windows during major holidays and other special occasions approved by the BHMA. Over the next century, the association's members included 6 Harvard University presidents, 12 U.S. presidents, 20 Boston mayors, and a myriad of Massachusetts governors and military personnel.

==== 1840s to 1870s ====
George M. Dexter began devising plans for a permanent entrance building in 1843, but he died while drawing the plans. William S. Park completed the plans, which were then delayed for lack of funding. Landscaping continued for years after the obelisk's official dedication. The new landscaping included a brick sidewalk, fence, and trees at Monument Square's perimeter, along with eight entrances and two concentric walkways in the park. A replica of the site's original Warren monument was placed inside the obelisk in 1845. The BHMA voted in 1849 to exclude inscriptions of names and dates from the obelisk; these inscriptions had been part of early plans, but the BHMA felt the inscriptions would detract from the obelisk's symbolism.

Henry Dexter was commissioned to design a sculpture of Joseph Warren in 1850. A wooden entrance building, the first Bunker Hill Lodge, was completed in 1857 and was the first significant modification of the monument. The first Bunker Hill Lodge, a single-story edifice, was intended as a temporary structure but lasted for over four decades. The Joseph Warren sculpture was displayed in this wooden building. During the American Civil War, the monument remained open, and over 40,000 people signed its guestbooks. A wooden flagpole mast was mounted from the top of the obelisk in 1861. To avoid detracting from the obelisk's appearance, this flagpole was removed in 1866, replaced the next year by a 140-foot-tall (43 m) freestanding flagpole northeast of the obelisk.

During the early 1870s, the BHMA undertook landscape upgrades to the site. The association removed the freestanding flagpole in 1874, after which the two poles atop the obelisk displayed flags only during special occasions. For the battle's centennial, a massive procession marched from Downtown Boston to the monument. The BHMA subsequently commissioned granite markers in 1876, commemorating important events in the battle, and it installed a fence around the purported site of Warren's death that year. The BHMA established a fund in the 1870s to replace the wooden structure with a permanent building and another fund for a proper memorial to Colonel Prescott.

==== 1880s to 1910s ====
George E. Ellis offered in 1880 to donate a bronze statue of Prescott, an offer the BHMA accepted that June. The association hired William Wetmore Story to design the statue, which was dedicated on the battle's 106th anniversary, June 17, 1881. A wire fence was built around the obelisk's platform in 1889. That year, the Boston Common Council passed legislation requesting that Boston's mayor ask Massachusetts's governor to take over the monument. Massachusetts state representative James E. Hayes proposed in 1893 that the state take over the monument and park. At the time, the obelisk was still in good shape, and the BHMA spent $7,000 annually on maintenance. (Note: Equivalent to $224,000 in 2025) State legislators rejected the state-takeover proposal in 1897.

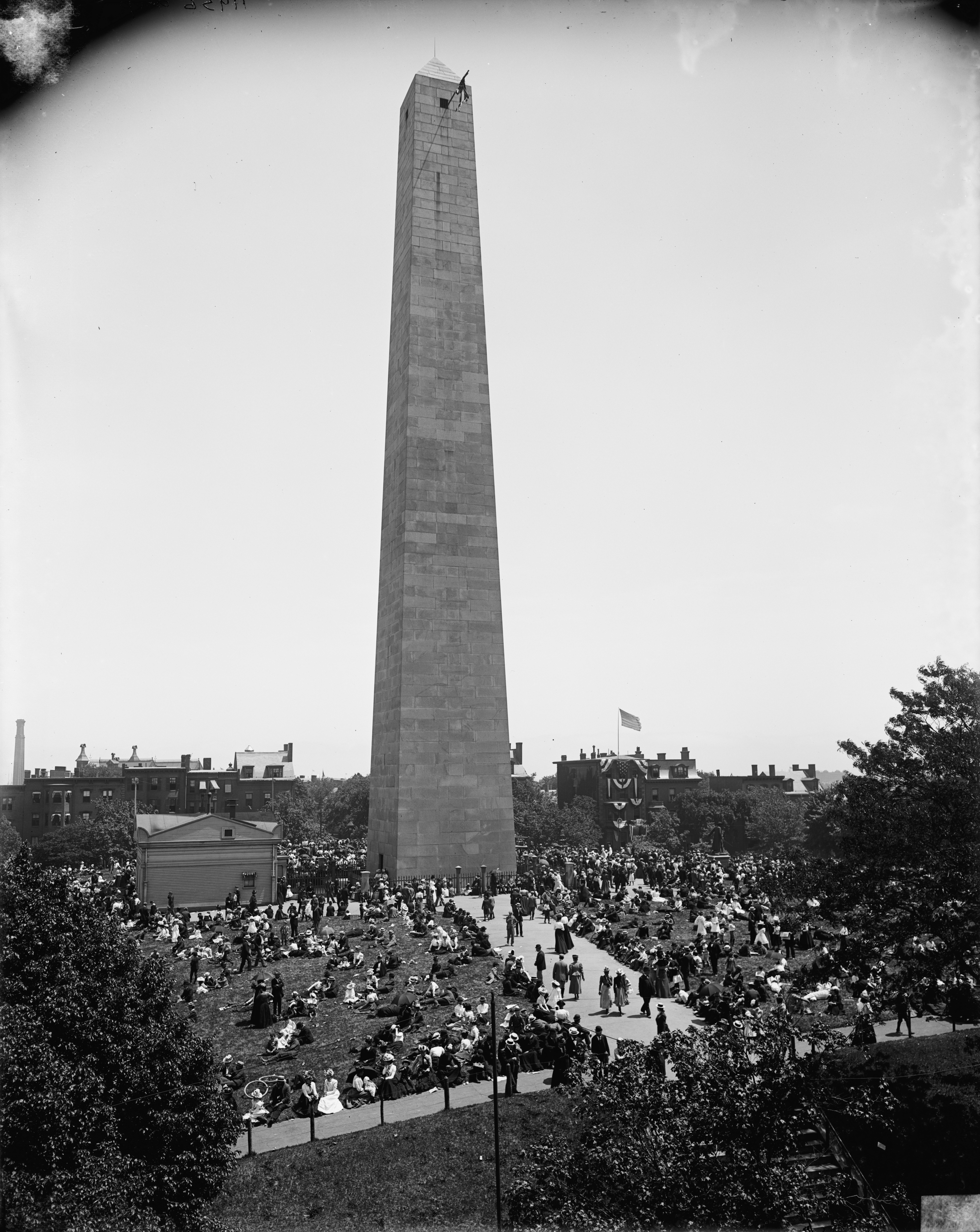
A Bunker Hill Day celebration, pictured between 1890 and 1901

A local group proposed installing exterior lights near the top of the obelisk in 1900, but this was not carried out, as the BHMA did not want to pay for the lighting. In June 1901, the BHMA voted to build the current granite entrance building at the obelisk's base, and the original wooden building was demolished the same year. The granite building opened to the public in October 1902. (Note: Although later sources largely describe the Bunker Hill Lodge as having been built in 1902, one source gives an alternate date of 1903.) Early the next year, a state legislator proposed taking over the monument's operation, but this legislation failed. While the BHMA's expenses could no longer be funded through ticket revenue alone, it still wished to keep operating the monument. The obelisk continued to display the American flag, and in 1903 the British flag was flown for the first time, commemorating a visit by the British Army's Honourable Artillery Company. The new entrance building displayed portraits of BHMA presidents until 1907, when they were removed in favor of artifacts relating to the battle itself.

During the early 20th century, the BHMA's expenses continued to rise, while the site fell into disrepair. The architect Charles Allerton Coolidge surveyed the site in 1907, finding that, among other things, the fence surrounding the obelisk's platform was unattractive. The monument's flags were removed in either 1910 or the 1920s. By the 1910s, the monument recorded more than 30,000 annual visitors, though substantially fewer people actually paid the fee to enter. By then, it cost about $5,000 per year to manage the grounds; the BHMA recorded only $4,100 in annual ticket revenue. (Note: The expenses are equivalent to $120,000, while revenue was equivalent to $98,000, in 2025) The association's board members included members of many prominent New England families, and the Detroit Free Press wrote in 1913 that about fifteen families effectively controlled the monument's operation. An inscription on the monument was proposed in 1914. During that decade, the BHMA continued to lose money, even after receiving large donations from several members.

=== MDC operation ===
State representative James Henry Brennan proposed in late 1918 that the state government take over the monument. Governor Calvin Coolidge signed legislation in April 1919 allowing such a takeover to occur, and the BHMA voted in June to turn over operations to the state government. The monument and park were deeded to the government of Massachusetts the next month. The Metropolitan District Commission (MDC) took over operation, establishing the Bunker Hill Reservation, which encompassed Monument Square Park. The MDC, which primarily oversaw parks and parkways, owned only one other historic site at the time: the Dorothy Quincy Homestead. Upon the MDC's takeover, the state government provided an annual appropriation for the monument's maintenance and operated it year-round except on Christmas. The BHMA remained in existence, continuing to own many artifacts from the war. These artifacts were lent to the MDC, which displayed them at the Bunker Hill Lodge.

==== 1910s to 1940s ====
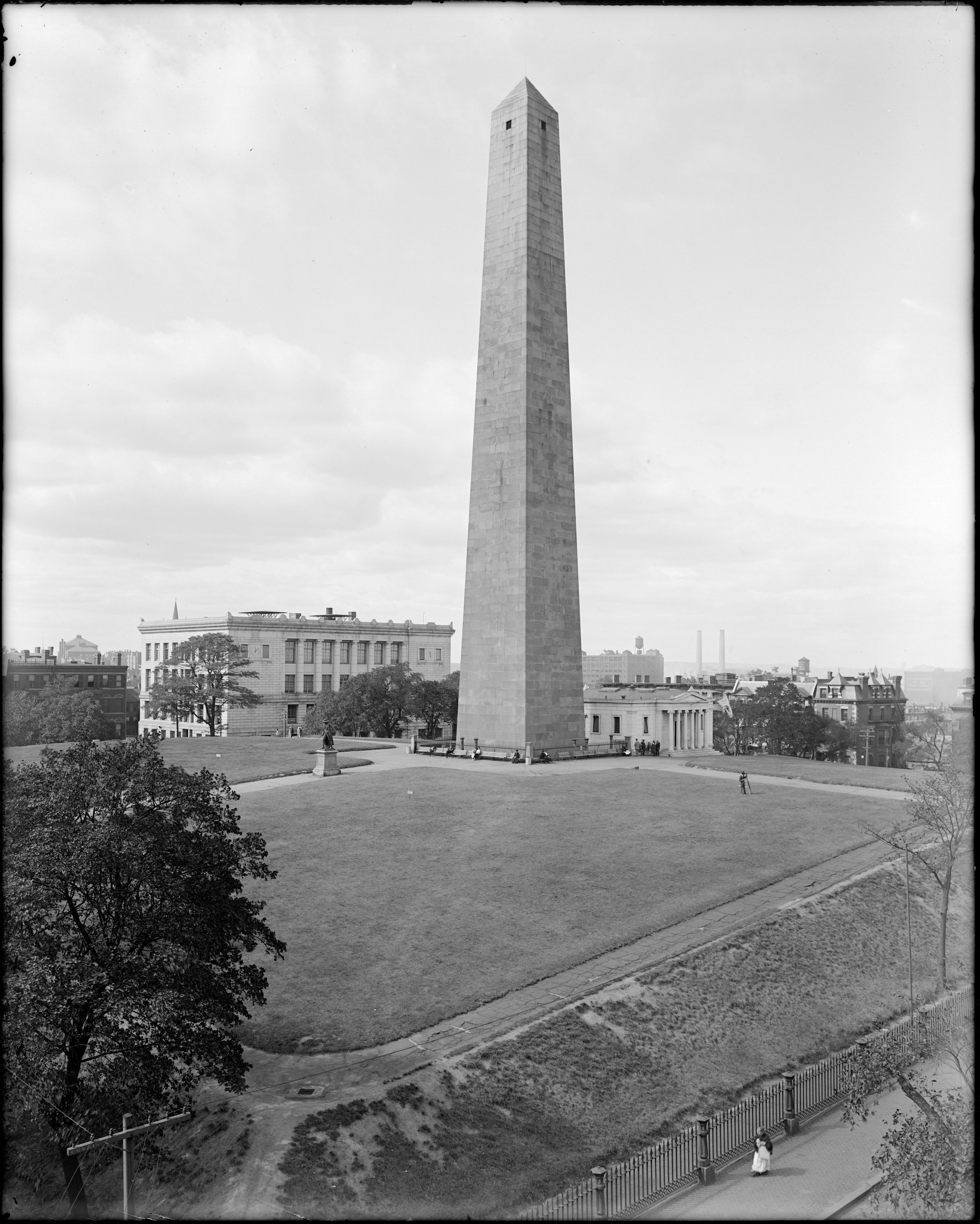
The obelisk photographed in 1920

Frederick Law Olmsted Jr. of the Olmsted Brothers landscape-design firm was hired to examine the site in 1919. At the time, Brennan claimed that pieces of the obelisk's exterior were falling out. After the MDC proposed in early 1920 that $35,000 be set aside for repairs, (Note: Equivalent to $425,000 in 2025) steeplejacks repointed the masonry that year. Two years later, the Massachusetts House of Representatives proposed further funds for repairs, and utilities were upgraded. The state legislature proposed in 1926 that the obelisk be illuminated at night. By the late 1920s, state representative Charles S. Sullivan claimed the monument was being neglected.

Although the federal Civilian Conservation Corps upgraded many MDC parks during the Great Depression, the corps did not perform work on the Bunker Hill Monument. During World War II, to prevent enemy forces from sabotaging the nearby Charlestown Navy Yard, visitors were banned from using cameras or scopes. The obelisk was temporarily closed from 1942 onward, although the entrance building continued operating. The agency installed a Battle of Bunker Hill diorama in the entrance building during 1947–1951.

==== 1950s to 1970s ====
The monument had 20,000 annual visitors by the early 1950s, relatively few of whom hailed from Boston. The federal government's Boston National Historic Sites Commission studied the site in 1956, finding that the obelisk, grounds, and entrance building had fallen into disrepair due to poor maintenance. Despite the presence of two policemen during the day, the monument was often vandalized. Visitors etched their names in the observatory atop the obelisk, where there was minimal surveillance, and the Prescott statue's sword was defaced so frequently that it was withdrawn from public display. Newspapers also reported on the site's poor condition.

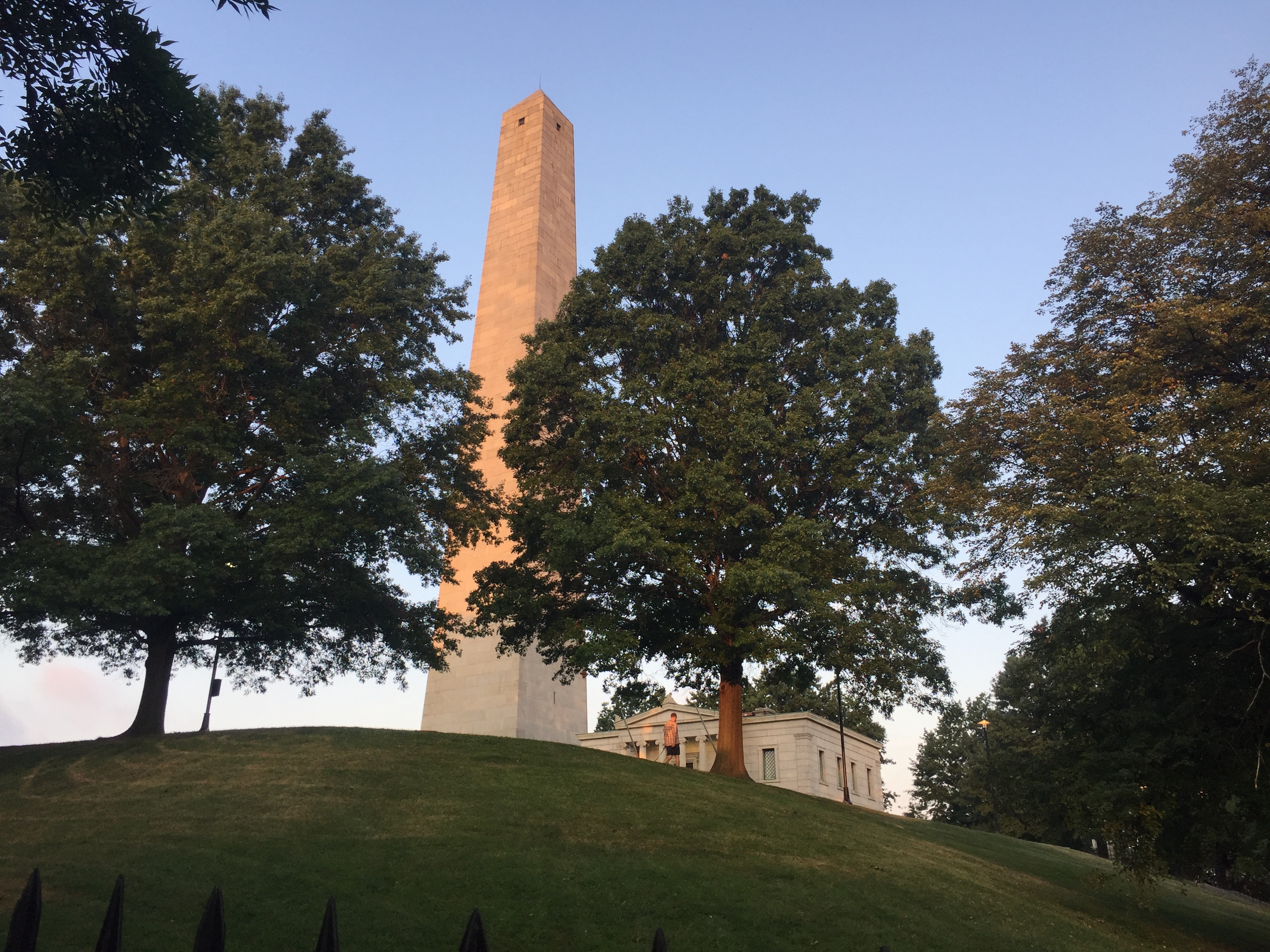
The obelisk as seen from the northeastern corner. The entrance lodge is visible at right.

After state legislator Gerard F. Doherty requested funds for cleaning the monument, rehabilitation efforts began in 1958. The MDC cleaned the obelisk's exterior and replaced fences and handrails, and explanatory plaques were added to the entrance building. While an MDC district commissioner retrospectively said this work made future maintenance easier, workers had not been able to completely remove stains and scratches. New lighting was installed in 1966, and, to prevent nighttime vandalism, the MDC constructed a steel cage between the entrance building and the obelisk the next year. Also in the 1960s, one of the monument's cannons was removed for safekeeping and stored in a nearby police station; it was later reinstalled in Minute Man National Historical Park. Spotlights were added in the 1970s, though they did not illuminate the whole monument at night.

Amid continuing maintenance issues, there were efforts in the mid-1960s to have the federal government take over the Bunker Hill Monument, which the BHMA endorsed. The MDC voted in 1968 to allow the federal government to take over the monument as a national historic site. The actual transfer process took several years, and the original national-site proposal was superseded by plans for a multi-site national park. The MDC notified U.S. senator Ted Kennedy in 1972 that it had no objections to the National Park Service (NPS) taking over the site. The monument and grounds were still in disrepair, and the Boston Redevelopment Authority wanted to rehabilitate it ahead of the United States Bicentennial. The monument became part of the newly-established Boston National Historical Park in 1974, though it remained under MDC control for two more years. During that period, the MDC and federal government jointly funded site improvements for the Bicentennial, and a large diorama of the battle was added to the entrance building.

=== NPS operation ===
The NPS took over operations in 1976. While the agency did not charge any admission fee, it closed the monument during U.S. government shutdowns. When the NPS took over, the monument had 150,000 annual visitors, and the Charlestown Historical Society ran a free-admission museum about the battle nearby. Relatively few visitors at the time were black, amid racial tensions in the largely-white neighborhood during the 1970s Boston desegregation busing crisis.

==== 1970s to 1990s ====
When the NPS took over, the site had again deteriorated, and the obelisk had broken granite and failing masonry joints. Modifications over the years were inconsistent with the original design. The Freedom Trail was extended to the monument in 1977. The monument was closed for repairs in December 1979, reopening the following November. The repairs included making the obelisk's foundation waterproof, repointing the stones, and adding fences. In addition, drainage and lighting systems were upgraded. Thomas Mahlstedt also began conducting the first archeological study of the site in 1980, during the renovation. His study, split up into several phases, uncovered numerous artifacts, of which only one object (a spoon) was deemed to have intrinsic value.

Visitation declined in the 1980s as tourists increasingly sought out other destinations such as Faneuil Hall and Faneuil Hall Marketplace. Two flagpoles were added to the obelisk in 1993, and American flags were hoisted atop them, marking the first time that flags were flown there since the early 20th century. The NPS completed a $100,000 renovation of the grounds in the mid-1990s, which involved conducting an archeological study of the battlefield.

==== 2000s to present ====
By the 2000s, the obelisk had 170,000 to 200,000 annual visitors. As part of a multiyear rehabilitation program for the Boston National Historical Park, the NPS announced in 2003 that it would renovate the monument and construct a museum for $3.1 million. The Massachusetts Grand Lodge provided another $500,000 for the project. By then, the monument had poor ventilation and often leaked; it was excessively hot during the summer and had to be closed during the winter. There was also loose masonry on the obelisk's exterior, and the entrance building had insufficient space for exhibits. the grounds were repaired in 2005–2006. The obelisk then closed to the public in May 2006 for a $3.7 million renovation, which included repairs, accessibility upgrades, and new lighting. The lights, consisting of metal-halide lamps, were installed along the obelisk's entire height. The obelisk repairs were completed in April 2007, and the Bunker Hill Museum was dedicated in the Charlestown Library that June. Most artifacts from the entrance building were moved to the museum, which exhibited artifacts, dioramas, and a cyclorama of the battle. Visitors climbing the obelisk during certain parts of the year had to obtain passes from the museum.

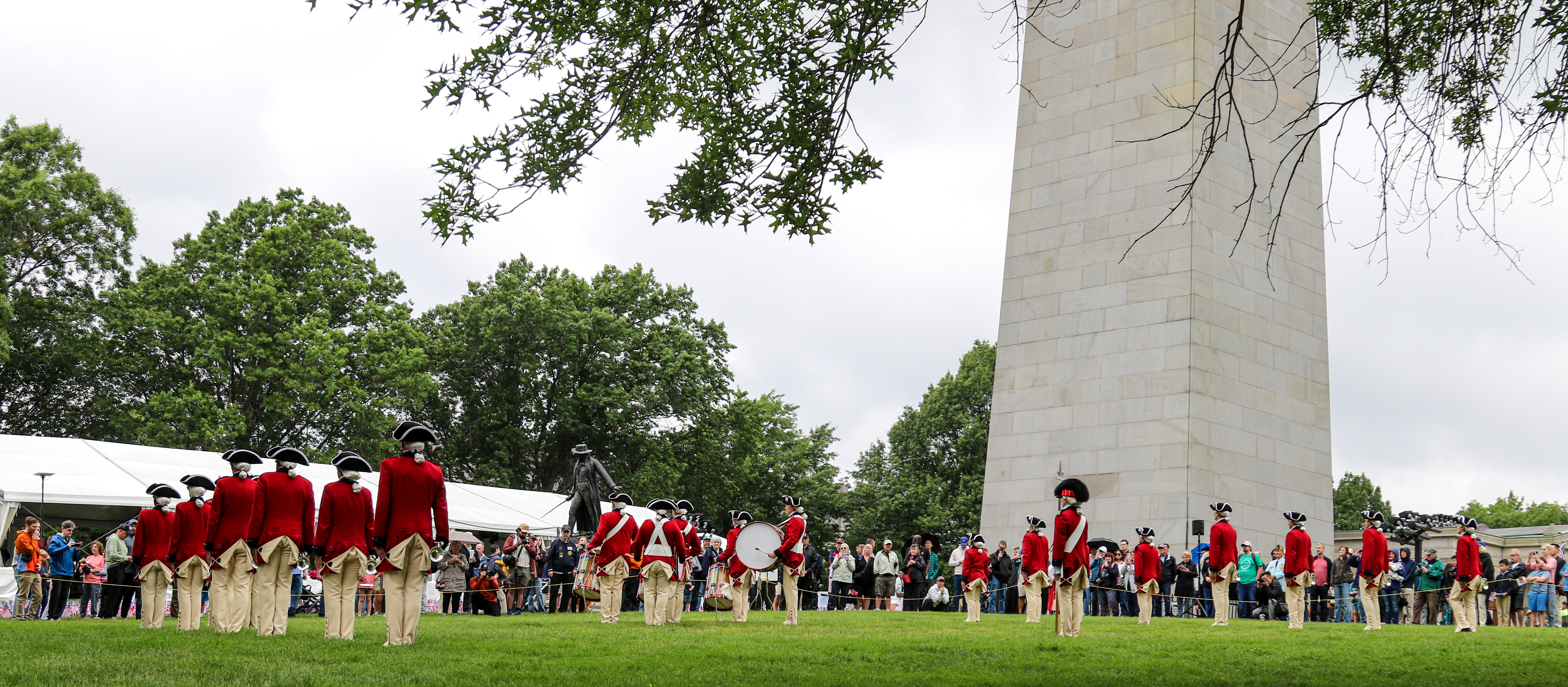
The 250th anniversary celebration of the Battle of Bunker Hill in 2025

Several documents pertaining to the monument were sold at auction in 2019 and again in 2021. The monument was temporarily closed during the COVID-19 pandemic in Massachusetts, during which the NPS displayed a live camera feed of Boston from atop the monument. In 2021, masons began repointing the pyramidion and the top ten courses of the shaft as part of a two-year project. A restoration of the entrance building was completed in 2022, and the NPS began making further repairs to the masonry the next year for $1.4 million. For the battle's 250th anniversary in 2025, flags were again flown atop the obelisk for three months, and the cornerstone ceremony was reenacted that June.

Further archeological studies of the old Bunker Hill redoubt took place around the monument in 2026, where researchers found artifacts from the Battle of Bunker Hill, including fortifications and musket balls. That June, following a visitor complaint, the administration of President Donald Trump removed three quotes regarding social issues from the monument's informational displays. U.S. District Judge Angel Kelley subsequently blocked the Trump administration from removing these signs, as part of a wider ruling where the administration was ordered to restore similar signs.

== Impact and legacy ==
=== Reception and influence ===
Until the Washington Monument was completed in 1885, the Bunker Hill Monument was the United States' largest obelisk. The Associated Press wrote that the obelisk had been the U.S.'s "first significant commemorative structure", and The Art Bulletin described it as the nation's oldest such obelisk. The war monument in High Point, New Jersey, built in 1930, was patterned after the Bunker Hill Monument. The obelisk's pyramidion inspired a similar feature atop the Griswold Monument in Connecticut, which was built without a pyramidion but was retrofitted with one in 1881. The obelisk's general design also inspired that of the nearby Zakim Bunker Hill Bridge's towers. After the Bunker Hill Monument was completed, granite was more widely used in buildings across the U.S.

At the monument's 50th anniversary in 1893, the Boston Daily Globe wrote that the obelisk "is of national interest" because of its size and because it commemorated an important battle. During the early 20th century, a writer for The Advance wrote that, although there were "finer monuments" around the world, "there is not one that is more important" to American history. The San Francisco Chronicle called the Bunker Hill Monument, Washington Monument, and Statue of Liberty "the three most glorious of all the monuments on the Western Hemisphere", and a Boston Daily Globe writer characterized a visit to the monument as a patriotic duty for Americans visiting Boston. Although the monument's creators had been affiliated with the Federalist Party, it later became a local symbol of the Whig party and democracy in general, and one source described it as representing "working-class immigrant pride in Charlestown".

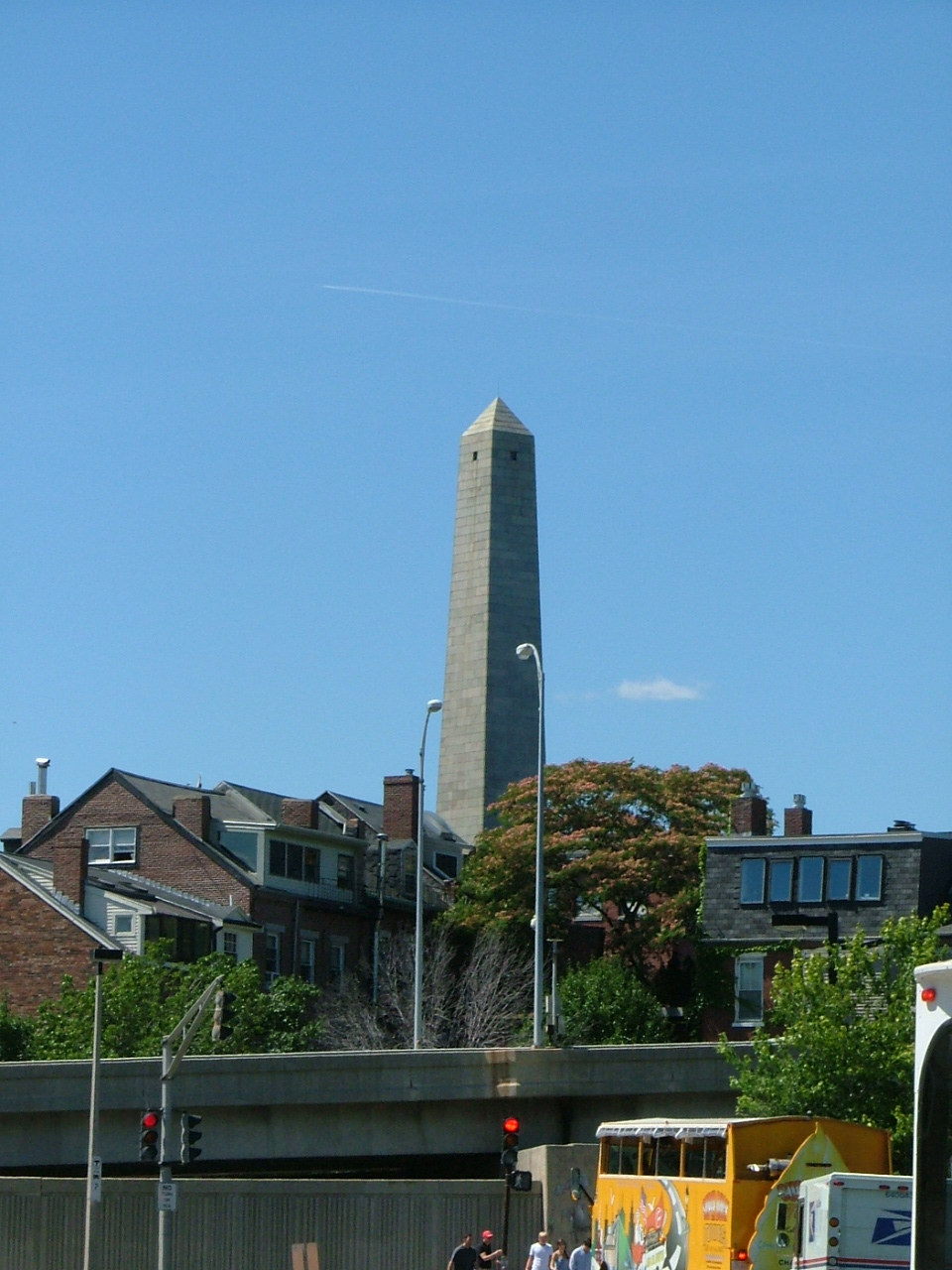
The monument as seen from downhill

The monument also stood out from the Boston skyline. One writer said that, until the 1910s, the obelisk and the gold-domed Massachusetts State House were "the two commanding objects in Boston". The Boston Daily Globe wrote in 1928 that the advent of skyscrapers and airplanes had made the obelisk less imposing. In 1947, a writer for Better Homes and Gardens wrote that the monument still commanded a "splendid view", even if the structure itself was "disappointing". Red Book magazine wrote in 1968 that the monument still stood "tall and majestic", and another commentator in 1980 called the Bunker Hill Monument and the Charlestown Navy Yard's USS Constitution "two of the most delightful stops on the [Freedom] Trail". In 2013, The New York Times wrote that the Bunker Hill Monument was an exception to Boston's general lack of "outsize monuments". The Times wrote in 2016 that, despite being imposing, the monument did not "instantly convey 'Boston' to a global audience" as places like the Statue of Liberty, Chrysler Building, or Empire State Building did for New York.

There has also been commentary about the obelisk's staircase. One commentator in 1925 described climbing the stair as an arduous affair that required training. Another said in 1987, "I almost would rather have fought the Battle of Bunker Hill than climbed the gray stone monument dedicated to it." A Frommer's guide called the climb "punishing" and said that the monument, with its small windows and lack of elevator, was "not a can't-miss experience".

=== Landmark designations ===
The Bunker Hill Monument became a National Historic Landmark (NHL) on January 20, 1961. The NHL designation was granted in part for the obelisk's role as a major early war memorial and in part because the site itself had historical significance. It was listed on the National Register of Historic Places (NRHP) in 1966, when the National Historic Preservation Act of 1966 went into effect. The NRHP nomination form cited the site's military significance. Also in 1966, the state government enacted further protections, prohibiting the use of eminent domain to acquire the land.

The monument is part of two United States historic districts. It is one of eight sites in the 43-acre (17 ha) Boston National Historical Park, which was designated in 1974. The monument and park are also part of the Monument Square Historic District, designated in 1987 partly for its architectural character. Outside Monument Square, the remainder of the former battlefield is not covered by any historic district, prompting local residents to create the Charlestown Historic Battlefield District Committee in 2023.

=== Media ===
Lydia Sigourney's poem "Bunker-Hill Monument" was published in her Scenes in my Native Land (1845) together with a description of both the monument and the battle. In her 1871 poetry collection New-England Legends, Harriet Prescott Spofford wrote a sketch about the monument and other sites in Charlestown. The monument has also been the subject of nonfiction work, such as several editions of Richard Frothingham Jr.'s 1849 book on the Battle of Bunker Hill, an 1877 book by former BHMA president George Washington Warren, and a 1953 book by E. H. Cameron.

The obelisk was depicted in a postage stamp issued in 1959 by the United States Post Office Department. A model of it is also shown alongside a sculpture of Sarah Josepha Hale in Newport, New Hampshire. The obelisk appears as a setting in the 2015 video game Fallout 4. The exterior of the obelisk has been used for artwork, such as a piece by Krzysztof Wodiczko hosted by the Institute of Contemporary Art in 1998, where interviews with Charlestown murder victims' family members were projected onto the monument.

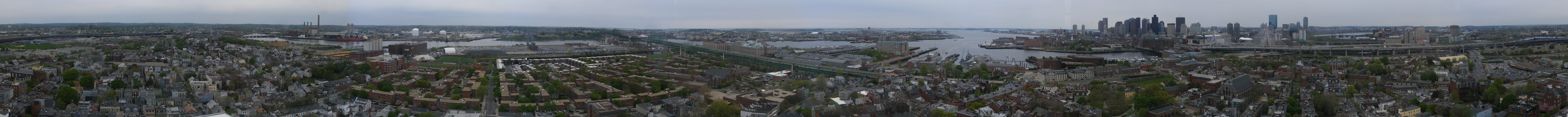
The view from the Bunker Hill Monument

== See also ==
- List of National Historic Landmarks in Massachusetts
- National Register of Historic Places listings in northern Boston, Massachusetts
- Breed's Hill Institute

Preceded by USS Constitution	Locations along Boston's Freedom Trail; Bunker Hill Monument	Succeeded by Last location – end of trail
