= Breed's Hill Institute =

American nonprofit organization

Breed's Hill Institute, founded by Dan Shippey, is a non-profit historical organization based in Orange, California, that provides content about the American Revolution. The organization, founded in 2005, seeks to inform about the reasons for the revolution and to clarify historical inaccuracies. More specifically, it "fosters discovery of the revolutionary ideas of the American founding through entertainment, education, and community projects."

== Breed's Hill ==
The institute is named after Breed's Hill, a hill in the Boston neighborhood of Charlestown, Massachusetts, where the fighting attributed to Bunker Hill was conducted. The patriots first positioned themselves on Bunker Hill, but realized that they were at a strategic advantage by fighting on Breed's Hill, where they were closer to British positions on land and to target warships in the harbor. A plaque at the Bunker Hill Monument, a National Park, mentions Breed's Hill and the National Park Service uses the hashtag #BreedsHillNotBunkerHill in some of its social media posts. The discrepancy is a subject in the book Wicked Pissed: New England's Most Famous Feuds by Ted Reinstein, a Boston reporter.

== Myths ==
They explore topics such as what percentage of the colonists were loyal to the British government and monarchy in "The One Third Myth".

== See also ==
- Elizabeth Burgin, the subject of The Great Raid about the release of more than 200 patriot prisoners of war from prison ships in New York Harbor
