= Statue of William Prescott =

Statue in Boston, Massachusetts, U.S.

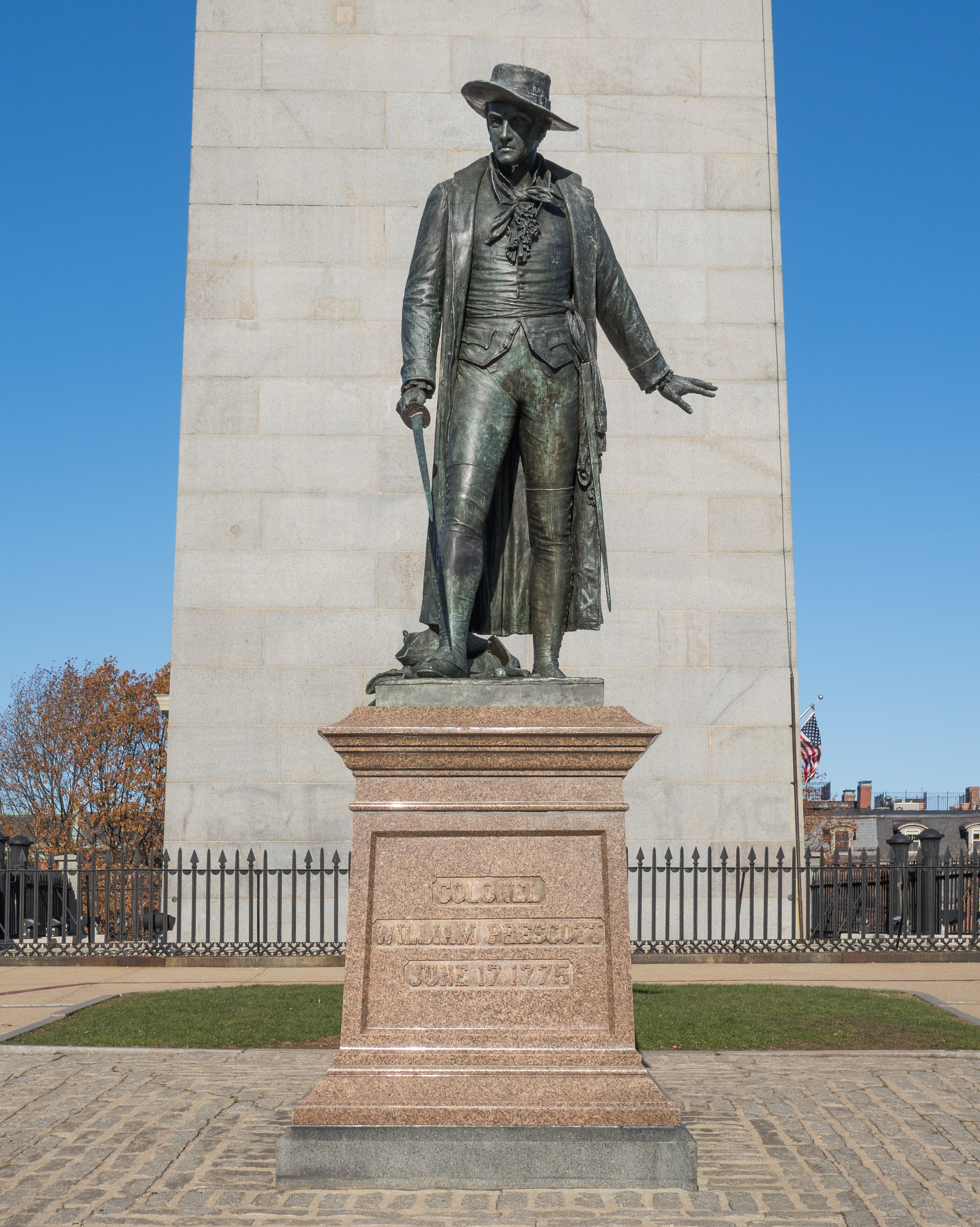
- The statue in 2019
- Artist: William Wetmore Story
- Subject: William Prescott
- Location: Boston, Massachusetts, U.S.; 42°22′34.2″N 71°3′39.2″W

A statue of American Revolutionary War hero William Prescott by William Wetmore Story is installed next to the Bunker Hill Monument in Monument Square Park, Charlestown, Boston, Massachusetts, United States.

== Description and history ==
The bronze sculpture was cast in 1880 in Rome by the founder Alessandro Nelli and dedicated in 1881. It measures approximately 8 ft. x 4 ft. x 5 ft. 10 in., and rests on a red and grey Quincy granite base that measures approximately 6 ft. 2 in. x 5 ft. 4 in. x 5 ft. 10 in. The work was surveyed by the Smithsonian Institution's "Save Outdoor Sculpture!" program in 1994.
