= Stephen H. Bancroft =

American businessman

Stephen H. Bancroft is the retired Dean of the Cathedral Church of St. Paul in Detroit, Michigan.

He has a bachelor's degree in History and Economics from Texas A&M and a Masters in Divinity from Virginia Theological Seminary. He first came to prominence as Rector of the Trinity Episcopal Church in Houston, Texas.

By 1994 he was being interviewed by the press in response to the ongoings of the Texas Diocese. While at the Trinity Church he was responsible for the creation of the Tax Incremental Refinance Zone #2 in Midtown Houston, which led to a $372,531,950 capture in appraised value in only eight years—more than doubling the previous land values of the region. In 2002 he was announced as a nominee for Bishop of the Episcopal Diocese of Texas, and as one of only three nominees for Bishop of the Episcopal Diocese of Southern Ohio in 2005.

He left his position as dean of the Cathedral Church of St. Paul in 2008 to become executive director of the Detroit Office of Foreclosure Prevention and Response. In his position with the organization he appeared on television shows, including Facing the Mortgage Crisis on PBS in 2009. He is currently the president and CEO of Commonwealth Holdings, a company that works in the modular homes business for workforce housing.
