= Bancroft Creek =

Stream in Freeborn County, Minnesota, U.S.

Coordinates: 43°39′12″N 93°22′26″W

Bancroft Creek is a stream in Freeborn County, in the U.S. state of Minnesota.

The creek was named for its location within Bancroft Township.

== See also ==
- List of rivers of Minnesota
