= Polly Feigl =

American biostatistician

Polly Feigl is an American biostatistician known for her work on survival distributions of patients with varying exponentially distributed survival rates and on cancer clinical trials. She is a professor emerita of biostatistics at the University of Washington.

== Education and career ==
Feigl majored in mathematics at the University of Chicago and earned a master's degree and Ph.D. in statistics from the University of Minnesota.

== Book ==
Feigl is the coauthor, with Johannes Ipsen, of Bancroft's Introduction to Biostatistics (2nd edition, Harper and Row, 1971), a revised edition of the widely used 1957 textbook by Huldah Bancroft.

== Recognition ==
Feigl was named a Fellow of the American Statistical Association in 1979.
