= Monument Square Historic District (Charlestown, Boston, Massachusetts) =

Historic district in Massachusetts, United States

- U.S. National Register of Historic Places
- U.S. Historic district
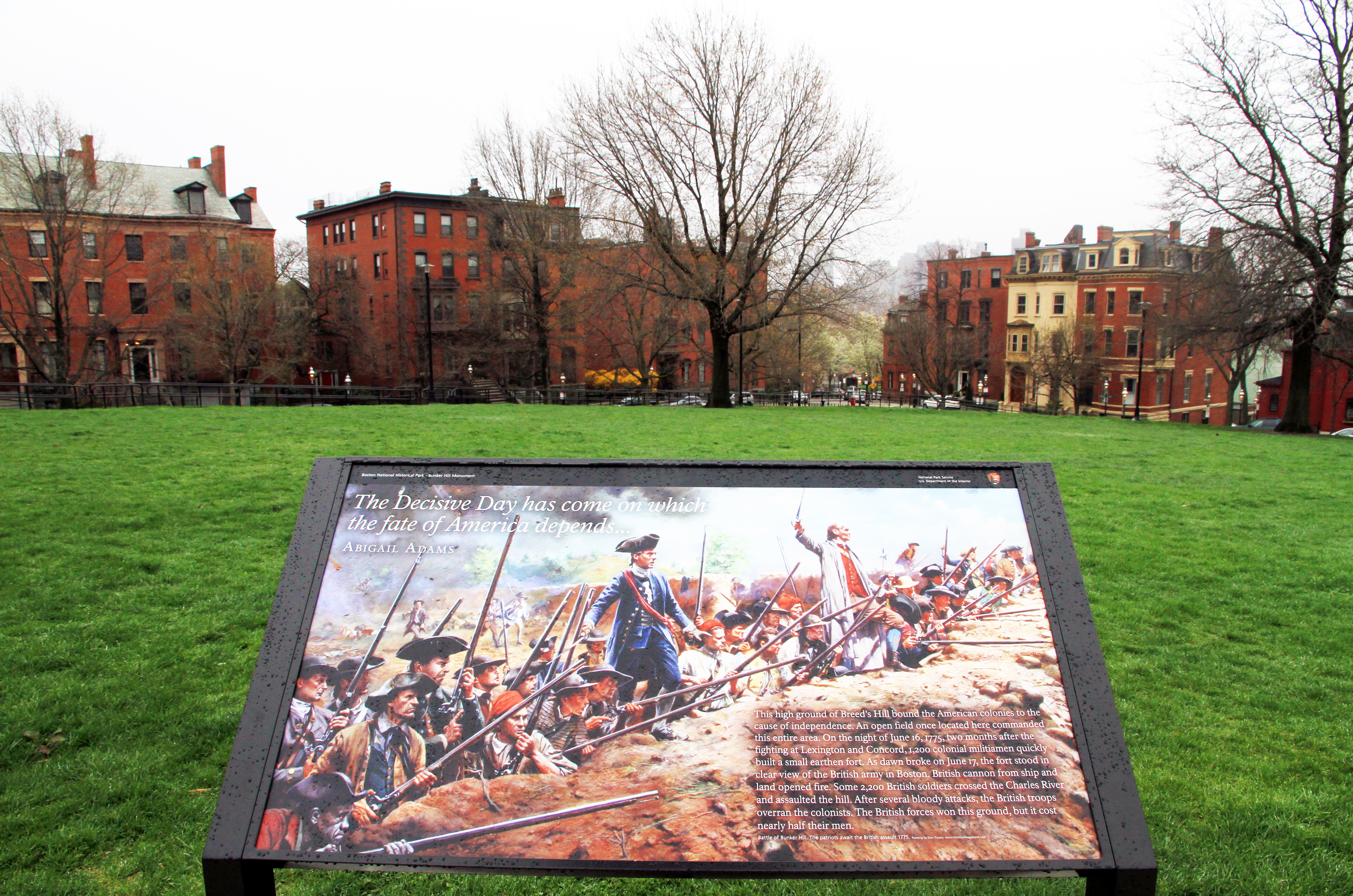
- Monument Square Park, 2013

- Location within Boston Location within Massachusetts Location within the United States
- Location: Monument Sq., Charlestown, Boston, Massachusetts
- Coordinates: 42.3763°N 71.0605°W
- Area: 8.3 acres (3.4 ha)
- Built: 1839
- Architect: Multiple
- Architectural style: Late Victorian, Greek Revival
- NRHP reference No.: 87001128
- Added to NRHP: June 2, 1987

The Monument Square Historic District encompasses a city park and its surrounding buildings at the top of Breed's Hill in the Charlestown neighborhood of Boston, Massachusetts. The location is notable as the site of the 1775 Battle of Bunker Hill, early in the American Revolutionary War. Monument Square was laid out in the 19th century, when the Bunker Hill Monument (a National Historic Landmark) was erected there. Monument Square Park is framed by predominantly residential buildings built in the mid-19th century.

The district was listed on the National Register of Historic Places in 1987.

== See also ==
- National Register of Historic Places listings in northern Boston, Massachusetts
