= Bancroft School of Massage Therapy =

American trade school in Massachusetts

Coordinates: 42.269°N 71.7779°W

The Bancroft School of Massage Therapy is a private for-profit trade school in Worcester, Massachusetts. It was founded in 1950 by Henry LaFleur, proprietor of the Bancroft Health Center, a facility specializing in Swedish massage and sports massage since 1938. He purchased the George School of Massage in Boston, Massachusetts, moved it to Worcester, and renamed it Bancroft School of Massage.

== Modernization and accreditation ==
In April 1980, Steve Tankanow, a student apprentice and friend of Henry's, purchased the health center and the school, allowing Henry to devote his time to teaching. Under Steve's guidance, Bancroft moved to modern quarters in the same building, officially becoming BSMT in November 1981.

Tanakow then began work on gaining academic recognition for the school, and for the profession of massage therapy as a whole. In November 1985, BSMT became the first "massage therapy" school to be licensed by the Department of Education of the Commonwealth of Massachusetts as an allied health school offering massage training.

In 1996, the school purchased its own building on Shrewsbury Street and designed an 18,000 square foot (1,700 m^{2}) training facility.

== Complementary health ==
In February 2002, Bancroft signed an alliance with Quinsigamond Community College (QCC) to give Bancroft graduates an opportunity to apply their credits from Bancroft towards completion of the Complementary Health associate degree program at Quinsigamond.

== General references ==
- Scrimenti, Bridget (August 26, 2007). "Massage Laws on the Table". Sun (Lowell, MA).
- SHEIN, ESTHER. "Back to school. More and more people dissatisfied with their careers are hitting the books for new and different degrees. How to make the switch?". The Phoenix, Boston.
