= Huldah Bancroft =

American biostatistician

- Died: September 25, 1966
- Education: University of Michigan; Columbia University; Case Western Reserve (PhD)
- Scientific career
- Fields: Statistics
- Workplaces: Case Western Reserve University; Tulane University

Huldah Bancroft (died September 25, 1966) was an American biostatistician at Tulane University, known for her textbook on biostatistics and for her research on tropical infectious diseases including typhoid fever and leprosy.

== Education and career ==
Bancroft graduated from the University of Michigan in 1915; she earned a master's degree at Columbia University and, in 1944, a Ph.D. from Case Western Reserve University, where she had been working as an assistant professor of biometrics. In 1947 she moved from Case to Tulane University, where she was appointed as an associate professor in the newly founded Department of Tropical Diseases and Public Health. By 1961 she had retired.

== Book ==
She published her book Introduction to Biostatistics with Harper & Row in 1957. A second edition, revised by Johannes Ipsen and Polly Feigl, was published as Bancroft's Introduction to Biostatistics in 1971.
