= Bancroft (motor vessel) =

History
- Builder: City of Baltimore
- Launched: 1925

General characteristics
- Length: 28.7 ft (8.7 m)
- Beam: 8.6 ft (2.6 m)
- Draft: 2.6 ft (0.79 m)
- Bancroft (motor vessel)
- U.S. National Register of Historic Places
- Location within Baltimore
- Location: Fell's Point, Baltimore, Maryland
- Coordinates: 39°16′54″N 76°35′30″W
- Built: 1925
- Architect: Baltimore City Bureau of Harbors
- Architectural style: Glass-cabin launch
- NRHP reference No.: 80001780
- Added to NRHP: 27 March 1980

Bancroft is a preserved glass-cabin launch, built in 1925 by the City of Baltimore, Maryland, United States. She is a documented work vessel of five net tons, licensed to carry six or less passengers for hire in the coasting trade. She has a registered length of 28.7 feet, her beam is 8.6 feet, and her draft is 2.6 feet. She was used continually for pier inspection by the City of Baltimore Harbor Engineer until 1966.

Bancroft was listed on the National Register of Historic Places in 1980.
