= Natalie Bancroft =

American businesswoman

- Born: 1980 (age 44–45)
- Occupation(s): Opera singer, executive board member
- Board member of: News Corp
- Relatives: H. Hugh Bancroft (great-grandfather)

Natalie Bancroft (born 1980) is a member of the board of directors of News Corporation.

== Biography ==
Bancroft is a member of the Bancroft family, which controlled the Dow Jones media empire for decades. She studied journalism, and graduated from the Institut de Ribaupierre in Lausanne, Switzerland. She is also a professionally trained opera singer.

Bancroft was appointed to the board of News Corporation at the age of 27, following News Corporation's acquisition of Dow Jones. She currently lives in New York.
