= Gertrude Bancroft =

American economist

- McNally, from a 1919 publication
- Born: December 23, 1908; Philadelphia, Pennsylvania, United States
- Died: January 28, 1985 (aged 76)

Academic background
- Education: University of Pennsylvania

Academic work
- Discipline: Economic statistics
- Institutions: United States Census Bureau

Gertrude Bancroft McNally (December 23, 1908 – January 28, 1985) was an American economist who was chief of the economic statistics section of the United States Census Bureau until 1951. She was later associated with the Social Science Research Council and special assistant to the commissioner of the Bureau of Labor Statistics.

== Education ==
Bancroft earned a master's degree in economics in 1934 from the University of Pennsylvania with a thesis on The effect of the War of 1812 on price relations in Philadelphia.

In 1958 she published the book The American Labor Force: Its Growth and Changing Composition (Wiley). This book, part of the Census Monograph Series produced by the Social Science Research Council in cooperation with the Census Bureau, analyzes the results of the 1950 United States census and associated data to measure the growth and makeup of workers and unemployed people within the US, and discover patterns of change in which kinds of people were working and what they did between 1940 and 1950.

== Honors and awards ==
In 1962, she was honored by the American Statistical Association by election as one of their Fellows for "distinguished service to the field of labor force statistics both in the development of objectively measurable concepts and in the promotion of public understanding of the uses and limitations of labor force data".
