= Bancroft Township, Freeborn County, Minnesota =

Township in Minnesota, United States

Bancroft Township
- Township
- Location within the state of Minnesota Bancroft Township (the United States)
- Coordinates: 43°42′46″N 93°22′3″W
- Country: United States
- State: Minnesota
- County: Freeborn

Area
  - Total: 33.7 sq mi (87.2 km^{2})
  - Land: 33.7 sq mi (87.2 km^{2})
  - Water: 0 sq mi (0.0 km^{2})
- Elevation: 1,243 ft (379 m)

Population (2000)
  - Total: 1,065
  - Density: 32/sq mi (12.2/km^{2})
- Time zone: UTC-6 (Central (CST))
  - Summer (DST): UTC-5 (CDT)
- FIPS code: 27-03466
- GNIS feature ID: 0663501

Bancroft Township is a township in Freeborn County, Minnesota, United States. The population was 1,065 at the 2000 census.

Bancroft Township was organized in 1858, and named for George Bancroft, an American historian.

== Geography ==
According to the United States Census Bureau, the township has a total area of 33.7 square miles (87 km^{2}), of which 33.7 square miles (87 km^{2}) is land and 0.03% is water.

Bancroft Creek flows through the township.

== Transportation ==
Interstate 35 crosses the eastern side of the township, leading north to Clarks Grove and south to Albert Lea. Interstate 90 crosses the southern side of the township, immediately north of Albert Lea. County Road 22 exit provides access to the township along I-90. Albert Lea Municipal Airport and Riverland College are both nearby. Other routes in the township include County Roads 14, 20, 25, 45, and 101.

== Demographics ==
As of the census of 2000, there were 1,065 people, 397 households, and 325 families residing in the township. The population density was 31.6 inhabitants per square mile (12.2/km^{2}). There were 404 housing units at an average density of 12.0 per square mile (4.6/km^{2}). The racial makeup of the township was 99.25% White, 0.09% African American, 0.28% Asian, 0.09% from other races, and 0.28% from two or more races. Hispanic or Latino of any race were 2.07% of the population.

There were 397 households, out of which 33.8% had children under the age of 18 living with them, 78.3% were married couples living together, 2.8% had a female householder with no husband present, and 18.1% were non-families. 15.1% of all households were made up of individuals, and 7.3% had someone living alone who was 65 years of age or older. The average household size was 2.68 and the average family size was 2.98.

In the township the population was spread out, with 25.9% under the age of 18, 4.8% from 18 to 24, 25.8% from 25 to 44, 28.9% from 45 to 64, and 14.6% who were 65 years of age or older. The median age was 41 years. For every 100 females, there were 112.2 males. For every 100 females age 18 and over, there were 105.5 males.

The median income for a household in the township was $47,102, and the median income for a family was $52,875. Males had a median income of $33,611 versus $24,904 for females. The per capita income for the township was $22,744. About 1.5% of families and 2.5% of the population were below the poverty line, including 2.2% of those under age 18 and 3.8% of those age 65 or over.
