= Frederick Bancroft (educator) =

Canadian educator

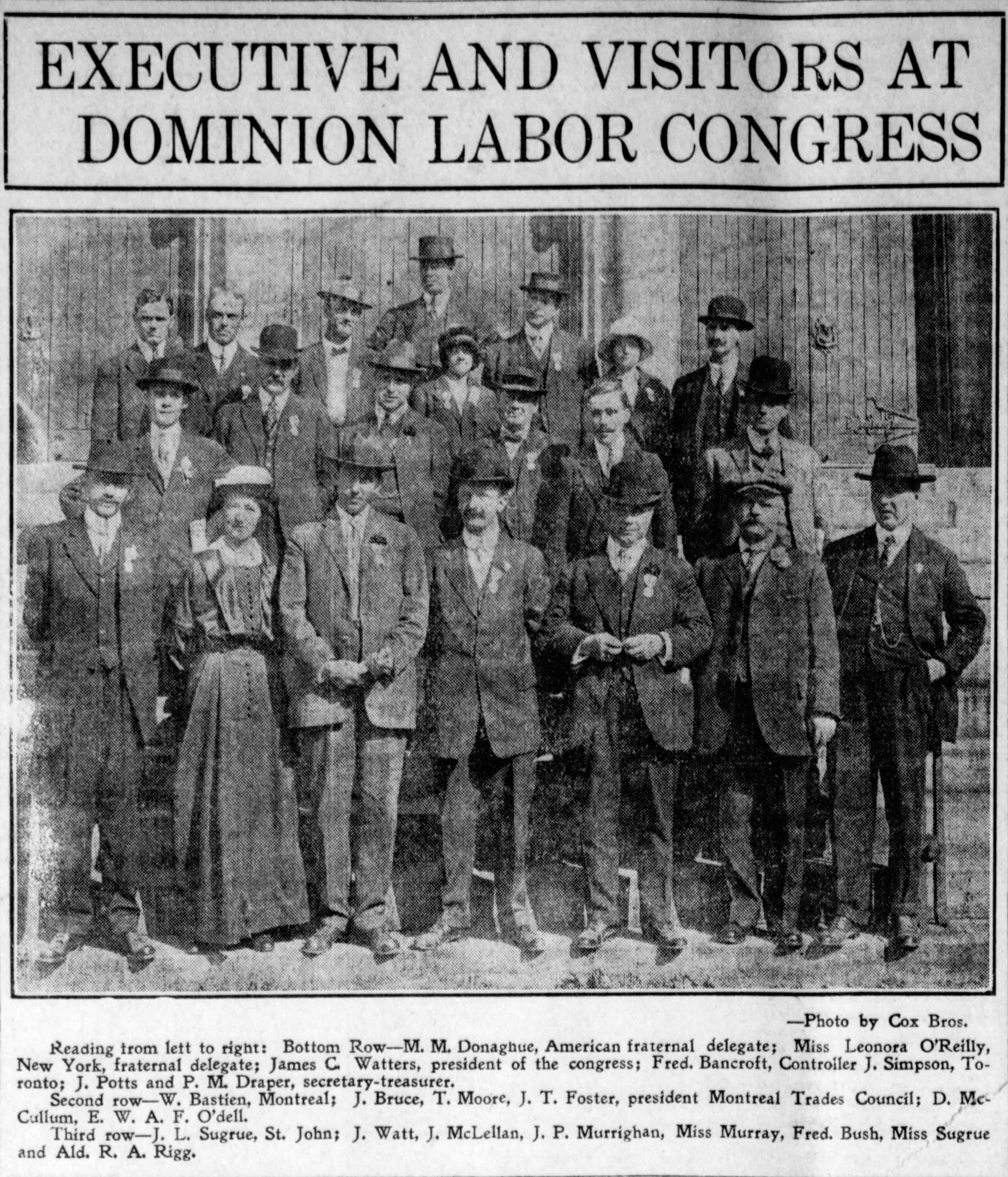
Bancroft (front row, center) at the Dominion Labor Congress, 1914

James Frederick Bancroft (August 5, 1855 – September 3, 1929) was an educator in Newfoundland Colony and Dominion.
