= Appraised value =

Assessed value of property

An appraised value (United States) or mortgage valuation (Australia) pertains to the assessed value of real property in the opinion of a qualified appraiser or valuer. It is usually a pre-qualification & risk-based pricing factor related to the issuance of mortgage loans by a financial institution.

== Overview ==
When obtaining a mortgage, the funding lender relies on the standardized valuation methods of an appraiser to assess a monetary value for the specific piece of real property on which a loan will be secured (e.g. a residence). The lender will then justify the loan amount (and other risk-based pricing) factors as a percentage of the appraised value of the property.

Appraised values can also be made after a property sale. For example, home owners wishing to gain access to their increased equity in their home may obtain a mortgage valuation to prove its value has risen and thus justify increasing the amount of their mortgage. Also, the various states of Australia each have a Valuer-General's Department, which regularly assess land values in all municipalities and shires for the purpose of issuing property tax notices.

A low appraised value will affect a buyer's ability to purchase property, because the loan amount would seem too high with respect to its value. Unless the buyer can come up with the difference, the buyer will unlikely be able to qualify for the loan.

== Appraisal fraud ==
Fraud in appraisal happens during both upturn and downturn markets. When a homeowner is looking to refinance their home, the appraiser is sometimes under pressure to overvalue the home to make the refinancing more attractive.

== See also ==
- Real estate appraisal
