= Germany–United States relations =

- Germany: United States

Diplomatic mission
- Embassy of Germany, Washington, D.C.: Embassy of the United States, Berlin

Envoy
- Ambassador Jens Hanefeld: Chargé d'affaires Alan Meltzer

Today, Germany and the United States are geopolitical and commercial trade partners. The two countries maintain a historically rooted but increasingly strained partnership. While they remain NATO allies with deep economic ties, public confidence in the relationship—especially in Germany—has deteriorated significantly amid disagreements over trade, security burdens, and foreign policy.

In the mid and late 19th century, millions of Germans migrated to farms and industrial jobs in the United States, especially in the Midwest. Later, the two nations fought each other in World War I (1917–1918) and World War II (1941–1945). After 1945 the U.S., with the United Kingdom and France, occupied Western Germany and built a demilitarized democratic society. West Germany achieved independence in 1949. It joined NATO in 1955, with the caveat that its security policy and military development would remain closely tied to that of France, the UK and the United States. While West Germany was becoming a Western Bloc state closely integrated with the U.S. and NATO, East Germany became an Eastern Bloc satellite state closely tied to the Soviet Union and the Warsaw Pact. After communist rule ended in Eastern Europe amid the Revolutions of 1989 and the fall of the Berlin Wall, Germany was reunified and the allied powers subsequently restored full sovereignty to Germany with the Treaty on the Final Settlement with Respect to Germany.

The reunified Federal Republic of Germany became a full member of the European Union (then European Community), NATO and one of the United States' closest partners in Europe during the 1990s; however, significant disagreements emerged in the 2000s over the Iraq War, when Germany under Chancellor Gerhard Schröder strongly opposed the U.S.-led invasion. Relations have faced recurring friction, particularly since the late 2010s, with tensions escalating during Donald Trump's second term; as of 2025–2026 under Chancellor Friedrich Merz, only about 27% of Germans view the relationship positively. Since Russia's full-scale invasion of Ukraine in 2022, Germany has sharply increased military aid to Ukraine, boosted defense spending, and reduced its dependence on Russian oil and gas, yet divergences with the U.S. persist on the scope of support, transatlantic trade disputes, and approaches to global challenges, leading Germany to emphasize greater European strategic autonomy while continuing pragmatic cooperation within NATO.

== Overview ==
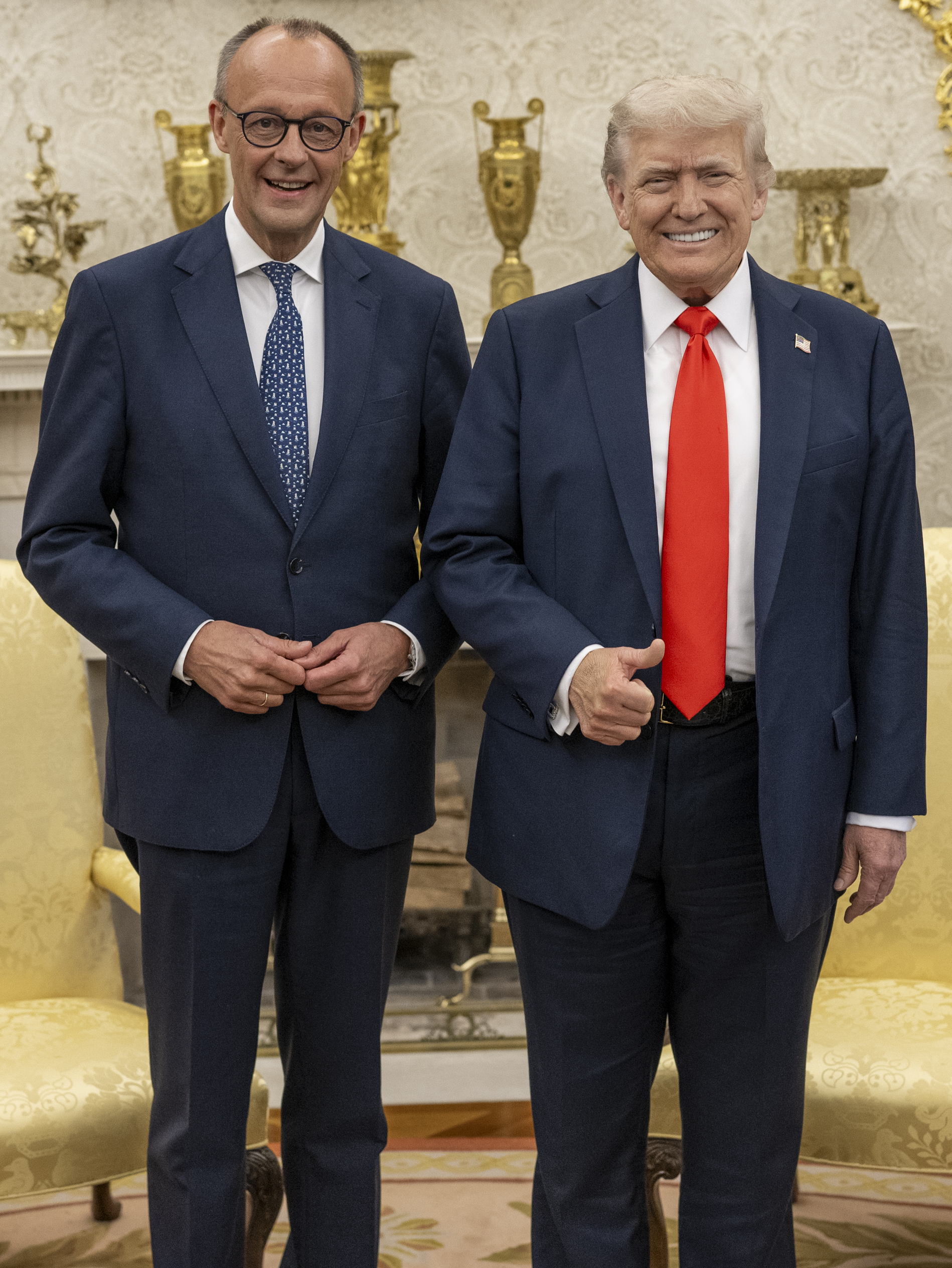
German Chancellor Friedrich Merz and U.S. President Donald Trump in the Oval Office of the White House on 5 June 2025

Before 1800, the main factors in German-American relations were very large movements of immigrants from Germany to American states (especially Pennsylvania, the Midwest, and central Texas) throughout the 18th and the 19th centuries.

There also was a significant movement of philosophical ideals that influenced American thinking. German achievements in public schooling and higher education greatly impressed American educators, and the American education system was based on the Prussian education system. Thousands of American advanced students, especially scientists and historians, studied at elite German universities. There was little movement in the other direction: few Americans ever moved permanently to Germany, and few German intellectuals studied in America or moved to the United States before 1933. Economic relations were of minor importance before 1920. Diplomatic relations were friendly but of minor importance to either side before the 1870s.

After the Unification of Germany in 1871, the country became a major world power. Both it and the US built world-class navies and began imperialistic expansion around the world. That led to a small-scale conflict over the Samoan islands, the Second Samoan Civil War. A crisis in 1898, when Germany and the United States disputed over who should take control, was resolved with the Tripartite Convention in 1899 when both nations divided up Samoa between them to end the conflict.

After 1898, the US itself became much more involved in international diplomacy and found itself sometimes in disagreement but more often in agreement with Germany. In the early 20th century, the rise of the powerful German Navy and its role in Latin America and the Caribbean troubled American military strategists. Relations were sometimes tense, as in the Venezuelan crisis of 1902–03, but all of the incidents were peacefully resolved.

During the encroachment of the new Entente, Kaiser Wilhelm sent Chancellor Bernhard von Bülow to discuss a triple alliance with the US and Qing China in 1907–1908.

The US tried to remain neutral in the First World War but provided far more trade and financial support to Britain and the other Allies, which controlled the Atlantic routes. Germany worked to undermine American interests in Mexico. In 1917, the German offer of a military alliance against the US in the Zimmermann Telegram contributed to the American decision for war. German U-boat attacks on British shipping, especially the sinking of the passenger liner RMS Lusitania without allowing the civilian passengers to reach the lifeboats, outraged US public opinion. Germany agreed to US demands to stop such attacks but reversed its position in early 1917 to win the war quickly since it mistakenly thought that the US military was too weak to play a decisive role.

The US public opposed the punitive 1919 Versailles Treaty, and both countries signed a separate peace treaty in 1921. In the 1920s, American diplomats and bankers provided major assistance to rebuilding the German economy. When Hitler and the Nazis took power in 1933, American public opinion was highly negative. Relations between the two nations turned sour after 1938.

Large numbers of intellectuals, scientists, and artists found refuge from the Nazis into Britain and France. Germany declared war on the United States, but American immigration policy strictly limited the number of Jewish refugees. The US provided significant military and financial aid to the United Kingdom and France. Germany declared war on the United States in December 1941, and Washington made the defeat of Nazi Germany its highest priority, above even the Japanese Empire after it directly militarily attacked the United States in the Pearl Harbor bombing. The United States played a major role in the occupation and reconstruction of Germany after 1945. The US provided billions of dollars in aid by the Marshall Plan to rebuild the West German economy. The two nations relationship became very positive, in terms of democratic ideals, anti-communism, and high levels of economic trade.

Today, the US is one of Germany's closest allies and partners outside of the European Union. While there is largely bipartisan positive sentiment towards Germany in the US, Germans have at times been more skeptical of the relationship due to disagreements on key policy issues. Americans want Germany to play a more active military role, but Germans strongly disagree.

== History ==
Relations between the United States and the different German states was generally friendly in the 19th century. Americans gave strong support to the revolutionary movements of 1848, and welcomed political refugees when that liberalizing revolution failed. The German states supported the United States during the Civil War, and gave no support to the Confederacy. At the time tensions between the United States and France were very high, and Americans generally supported the Germans in their war against France in 1870–71.

=== German immigration to the United States ===
Self-reported ancestry of the population of the United States (by counties, 2001)

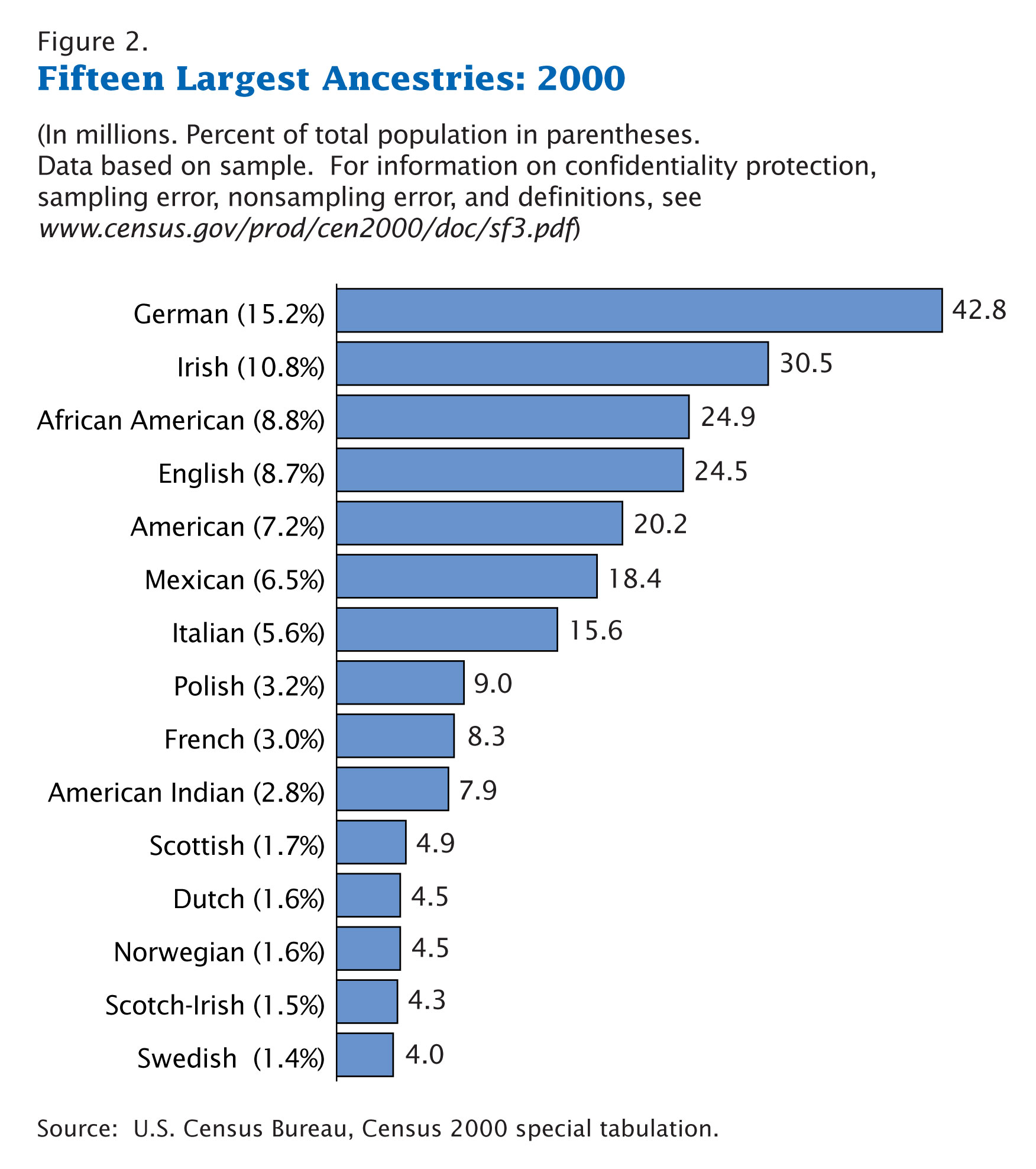
Largest self-reported ancestries in the United States (2000)

For over three centuries, immigration from Germany accounted for a large share of all American immigrants. As of the 2000 US Census, more than 20% of all Americans, and 25% of white Americans, claim German descent. German-Americans are an assimilated group which influences political life in the US as a whole. They are the most common self-reported ethnic group in the Northern United States, especially in the Midwest. In most of the South, German Americans are less common, with the exception of Texas.

==== 1683–1848 ====
The first records of German immigration date back to the 17th century and the foundation of Germantown, now part of Philadelphia, in 1683. Immigration from Germany reached its first peak between 1749 and 1754, when approximately 37,000 Germans came to North America. The main settlements were in Pennsylvania, where they are known as the Pennsylvania Dutch; nearby areas of upstate New York also attract the Germans in the colonial era.

==== 1848–1914 ====
In 1840-1914 about seven million Germans emigrated to the United States. Farmers who sold their land in Germany bought larger farms in the Middle West. Mechanics settled in the cities of Baltimore, Cincinnati, St. Louis, Chicago, Detroit, and New York City. Few went to New England or the South, apart from a colony formed in Texas. By 1890, more than 40 percent of the population of the cities of Cleveland, Milwaukee, Hoboken and Cincinnati were of German origin. By the end of the 19th century, Germans formed the largest self-described ethnic group in the United States and had a strong German—speaking element. They were generally permanent settlers; few either returned to Germany or showed a loyalty to the mother country. Some were political refugees; others were avoiding the universal conscription. They generally spoke the German language until the US entered World War I in 1917 although the younger generation was bilingual.

The failed German Revolutions of 1848 forced political refugees to flee. Those who came to the US were called the Forty-Eighters. Many joined the new anti-slavery Republican Party, such as Carl Schurz, a nationally important politician. In the late 19th century Germans were active in the labor movement. Labor unions enabled skilled craftsmen to control their working conditions and to have a voice in American society.

==== Since 1914 ====
A combination of patriotism and anti-German sentiment along with civil strife during both world wars caused most German-Americans to cut their former ties and assimilate into mainstream American culture with disbanding of German cultural groups. There was a collapse in teaching the German language in schools and colleges. German-related placenames were also changed.

In 1937, during the Hindenburg's 63rd voyage, which had long been the preferred mode of rapid transatlantic travel between the United States and Germany, a tragic incident occurred as it met its unfortunate end in a catastrophic crash in Lakehurst, New Jersey, USA.

In the wake of this devastating event, rumors and speculations circulated among some German citizens, suggesting the possibility of sabotage orchestrated by elements within the United States government. While these suspicions did arise, their impact on diplomatic relations between the United States and Nazi Germany in 1937 remained relatively limited.

During the Third Reich (1933–1945) a wave of German Jews and other political anti-Nazi refugees left, but restrictive immigration policies blocked many of them from entering the U.S. Among those who did enter were Albert Einstein and Henry Kissinger.

Today, German-Americans form the largest self-reported ancestry group in the United States, with California and Pennsylvania having the highest numbers with German ancestry.

=== Education and culture ===
German culture was an important inspiration for American thinkers before 1914.

==== Philosophy ====
The influential literary, political, and philosophical movement of Transcendentalism emerged in New England in the early 19th century. It centered around Ralph Waldo Emerson and derived from European Romanticism, German Biblical criticism, and the transcendental philosophy of Immanuel Kant and German idealism. In the late 19th century German Hegelianism was taught by Friedrich August Rauch as well as William T. Harris and the St. Louis Hegelians. It represented an extreme idealism in opposition to pragmatism.

==== Education ====
Upon becoming the secretary of education of Massachusetts in 1837, Horace Mann (1796–1859) worked to create a statewide system of professional teachers, based on the Prussian model of "common schools." Prussia was developing a system of education by which all students were entitled to the same content in their public classes. Mann initially focused on elementary education and on training teachers. The common-school movement quickly gained strength across the North. His crusading style attracted wide national support, providing a German roots for the school systems in most states. An important technique which Mann had learned in Prussia and introduced in Massachusetts in 1848 was to place students in grades by age. They progressed through the grades together, regardless of differences of aptitude. In addition, he used the lecture method common in European universities, which required students to receive professional instruction rather than teach one another. American adopted the German kindergarten. German immigrants brought gymnastics and physical education through the Turner movement.

Over 15,000 American scholars and scientists studied at German universities before 1914; 8% were women. They returned with PhDs and built research-oriented universities based on the German model, such as Cornell, Johns Hopkins, Chicago and Stanford, and upgraded established schools like Harvard, Columbia and Wisconsin. Flush with dollars, they built research libraries overnight, often by purchasing major collections in Europe. Syracuse University purchased the research library of Germany's leading historian Leopold von Ranke (1795–1886).

==== Music ====
In the colonial era, the Pennsylvania German sects brought their love of music. Moravian music proved widely influential. In the mid to late 19th century, Philadelphia, Boston, New York, Cincinnati, Chicago and other musically inclined cities created symphony orchestras which featured German classical music; prominent German conductors were hired, along with performers and teachers. Theodore Thomas (1835–1905) was the most influential figure, introducing modern European composers and orchestral technique to New York, Cincinnati and Chicago.

In return, Matthias Hohner brought the harmonica to Germany in 1857, where hooty-tooty became popular.

==== Science and medicine ====
Samuel Hahnemann (1755–1843) was a German physician who created pseudoscientific system of alternative medicine called homeopathy. It was introduced to the United States in 1825 by Hans Birch Gram, a student of Hahnemann. It became popular in the U.S. well before it caught on in Germany. Physicians in Germany learned about narcotics for anesthesia from the U.S.

=== Diplomacy and trade ===
==== 1775 to 1870 ====
During the American Revolution (1775–1783), King Frederick the Great of Prussia strongly hated the British. He favored the Kingdom of France and impeded Britain's war effort in subtle ways, such as blocking the passage of Hessian mercenaries. However, the importance of British trade and the risk of attack from Austria made him pursue a peace policy and maintain an official strict neutrality.

After the war, direct trade was minimal. What existed ran between the American ports of Baltimore, Norfolk, and Philadelphia and the old Hanseatic League free cities of Bremen, Hamburg, and Lübeck grew steadily. Americans exported tobacco, rice, cotton, and imported textiles, metal products, colognes, brandies, and toiletries. The Napoleonic Wars (1803–1815) and increasing instability in the German Confederation states led to a decline in the modest trade between the United States and the Hanse cities. The level of trade never came close to matching the trade with Britain. It further declined because the US delayed a commercial treaty until 1827. US diplomacy was ineffective, but the commercial consuls, local businessmen, handled their work so well that the US successfully developed diplomatic ties with the Kingdom of Prussia.

The Kingdom of Prussia under Friedrich Wilhelm III took the initiative in sending trade experts to Washington in 1834. The first permanent American diplomat came in 1835, when Henry Wheaton was sent to Prussia. The American secretary of state (foreign minister) said in 1835 that "not a single point of controversy exists between the two countries calling for adjustment; and that their commercial intercourse, based upon treaty stipulations, is conducted upon those liberal and enlightened principles of reciprocity... which are gradually making their way against the narrow prejudices and blighting influences of the prohibitive system." The German revolutions of 1848–1849 were celebrated in the U.S., which was the only major country to bestow diplomatic recognition on its short-lived National Assembly in Frankfort. When the revolution was crushed, thousands of activists fled to the United States. The most important were Carl Schurz, Franz Sigel and Friedrich Hecker. The exiled Germans became known as the Forty-Eighters. As the German element grew in Illinois, Abraham Lincoln worked to secure their support in the 1850s, including sponsoring a German language newspaper. However apart from the 48ers, most were Democrats.

During the American Civil War (1861–1865), all of the German states favored the northern Union but remained officially neutral. They did not support France's takeover of Mexico. Immigration flows continued and large numbers of immigrants and their sons enlisted in the Union Army. In St Louis, pro-Union German provided decisive support to suppress Confederate supporters.

U.S. Consul General William Walton Murphy, based in Frankfurt on the Main, neutralized attempts by Confederates to borrow money. He solicited medical supplies, sold American bonds, facilitated German purchases of cotton seized by the U.S. Army, and promoted support for Lincoln's war goals in the German press. After the war Washington was neutral but favored Prussia in its wars against Denmark and Austria and felt that consolidation under Prussia was a good idea. Prussia was planning a major war against France and cultivated American support.

==== After 1871 ====
Washington was neutral in the Franco-Prussian War of 1870–71, but public opinion favored the German cause. Relations with the new German Empire started on a high note. German men who immigrated to the U.S. then returned home were liable for military service, but that was a minor irritant and was largely resolved by treaties negotiated by American minister George Bancroft in 1868. In 1876, the German commissioner for the Centennial Exhibition in Philadelphia stated that the German armaments, machines, arts, and crafts on display were of inferior quality to British and American products. Germany industrialized rapidly under Chancellor Otto von Bismarck in 1870–1890, but its competition was more with Britain than with the US. It imported increasing amounts of American farm products, especially cotton, wheat and tobacco.

==== Pork war and protectionism ====
In the 1880s, ten European countries (Germany, Italy, Portugal, Greece, Spain, France, Austria-Hungary, the Ottoman Empire, Romania, and Denmark) imposed a ban on importation of American pork. They pointed to vague reports of trichinosis that supposedly originated with American hogs. At issue was over 1.3 billion pounds of pork products in 1880, with a value of $100 million annually. European farmers were angry at cheap American food overrunning their home markets for wheat, pork, and beef; demanded for their governments to fight back; and called for a boycott.

European manufacturing interests were also threatened by growing American industrial exports, and were angry at the high American tariff on imports from European factories. Chancellor Bismarck took a hard line, rejected the pro-trade German businessmen, and refused to join in scientific studies proposed by President Chester A. Arthur. American investigations reported that American pork was safe. Bismarck, because of his political base of German landowners, insisted on protection and ignored the leading German expert, Professor Rudolf Virchow, who condemned the embargo as unjustified. American public opinion grew angry at Berlin. President Grover Cleveland rejected retaliation, but it was threatened by his successor, Benjamin Harrison, who charged Whitelaw Reid, minister to France, and William Walter Phelps, minister to Germany, to end the boycott without delay. Harrison also persuaded Congress to enact the Meat Inspection Act of 1890 to guarantee the quality of the export product. President Harrison used his Agriculture Secretary Jeremiah McLain Rusk to threaten Berlin with retaliation by initiating an embargo against Germany's popular beet sugar. That proved decisive for Germany to relent in September 1891. Other nations soon followed, and the boycott was soon over.

==== Samoan crisis ====
Bismarck himself did not want colonies, but he reversed course in the face of public and elite opinion that favored imperialistic expansion around the world. In 1889, the US, Britain and Germany were locked in a petty dispute over control of the Samoan Islands, in the Pacific. The islands provided an ideal location for coaling stations needed by steamships in the South Pacific. The issue emerged in 1887 when the Germans tried to establish control over the island chain and President Cleveland responded by sending three naval vessels to defend the Samoan government. American and German warships faced off. Suddenly both sides were badly damaged by the 1889 Apia cyclone of March 15–17, 1889. The two powers and Britain agreed to meet in Berlin to resolve the crisis.

Chancellor Bismarck decided to ignore the small issues involved and improve relations with Washington and London. The result was the Treaty of Berlin, which established a three-power protectorate in Samoa. The three powers agreed to Western Samoa's independence and neutrality. Historian George H. Ryden argues that President Harrison played a key role by taking a firm stand on every issue, which included the selection of the local ruler, the refusal to allow an indemnity for Germany, and the establishment of the three-power protectorate, a first for the U.S. A serious long-term result was an American distrust of Germany's foreign policy after Bismarck was forced to resign in 1890. When unrest continued, international tensions flared in 1899. Germany unilaterally pulled back the treaty and established a control over Western Samoa. It was seized by New Zealand in the First World War.

==== Caribbean ====
In the late 19th century, the Kaiserliche Marine (German Navy) sought to establish a coaling station somewhere in the Caribbean Sea area. Imperial Germany was rapidly building a blue-water navy, but coal-burning warships needed frequent refueling and so needed to operate within range of a coaling station. Preliminary plans were vetoed by Bismarck, who did not want to antagonize the US, but he was ousted in 1890 by the new emperor, Wilhelm II, and the Germans kept looking.

Wilhelm did not publicly challenge Washington's Monroe Doctrine but his naval planners from 1890 to 1910 disliked it as a self-aggrandizing legal pretension and were even more concerned with the possible American canal at Panama, as it would lead to full American hegemony in the Caribbean. The stakes were laid out in the German war aims proposed by the German Navy in 1903: a "firm position in the West Indies," a "free hand in South America," and an official "revocation of the Monroe Doctrine" would provide a solid foundation for "our trade to the West Indies, Central and South America." By 1900, American "naval planners were obsessed with German designs in the Western Hemisphere and countered with energetic efforts to secure naval sites in the Caribbean."

By 1904, German naval strategists had turned its attention to Mexico, where they hoped to establish a naval base in a Mexican port on the Caribbean Sea. They dropped that plan, but it became active again after 1911, the start of the Mexican Revolution and subsequent Mexican Civil War.

==== Venezuelan crisis of 1902–1903 ====
Venezuela defaulted on its foreign loan repayments in 1902, and Britain and Germany sent warships to blockade its ports and force repayment. Germany intended to land troops and occupy Venezuelan ports, but President Theodore Roosevelt got all sides to enter arbitration, which ended the crisis. In the short run in 1904 Roosevelt issued the Roosevelt Corollary, telling Europe when European nations had serious grievances in the Caribbean, the United States would intervene and resolve the crisis for them.

Years later in 1916, when Roosevelt was energetically campaigning for the U.S. to enter World War I against Germany, he claimed that in 1903 he issued an ultimatum threatening war with Germany, forcing Berlin to back down. There is no record of any stern warning in the archives in Berlin or Washington, nor in the papers of any top American official dealing with foreign or military policy, nor anyone in Congress. No observer in Washington or Berlin had ever mentioned the supposed ultimatum. According to historian George C. Herring in 2011:

No evidence has ever been discovered of a presidential ultimatum. Recent research concludes, on the contrary, that although the Germans behaved with their usual heavy-handedness, in general they followed Britain's lead. The British, in turn, went out of their way to avoid undermining their relations with the United States. Both nations accepted arbitration to extricate themselves from an untenable situation and stay on good terms with the United States.

=== American images of Germany before 1917 ===
By 1900 American writers were criticizing German aggressiveness in foreign affairs, and warned against German militarism. Books on anti-German topics including politics, naval power, and diplomacy reached educated audiences. German-Americans stayed neutral and largely ignored Berlin; indeed many of them had left as young men to escape the German draft. The Venezuela episode of 1903 focused American media attention on Kaiser Wilhelm II, who was increasingly erratic and aggressive. The media highlighted his militarism and belligerent speeches and imperialistic goals. Meanwhile, London was becoming increasingly friendly toward Washington. However, when the U.S. was neutral in the First World War, Hollywood tried to be neutral.

No one expected a war in 1914 until the July Crisis suddenly saw a major war between the Central Powers (Germany and Austria-Hungary) and the Allied Powers (France, Britain and Russia), with smaller nations also involved. The US insisted on neutrality. President Woodrow Wilson's highest priority was to broker a peace and he used his trusted aide, Colonel House on numerous efforts. For example, on June 1, 1914, House met secretly with the Kaiser in his palace, proposing that Germany, the United States, and Britain unite to ensure peace and develop Third World countries. The Kaiser was mildly interested but Britain was in a major domestic crisis over Ireland and nothing developed.

Apart from an Anglophile element of British descent, America public opinion at first echoed Wilson. The sentiment for neutrality was particularly strong among Irish Americans, German Americans, and Scandinavian Americans as well as poor white southern farmers, cultural leaders, Protestant churchmen, and women in general.

The British argument that the Allies were defending civilization against a German militaristic onslaught gained support after reports of atrocities in Belgium in 1914. Outrage followed the sinking of the passenger liner RMS Lusitania in 1915. Americans increasingly came to see Germany as the aggressor who had to be stopped. Former President Roosevelt and many Republicans were war hawks, and demanded rapid American armament. Wilson insisted on neutrality and minimized wartime preparations to be able to negotiate for peace. After the Lusitania was sunk, with over 100 American passengers drowned, Wilson demanded that Imperial German Navy U-boats follow international law and allow passengers and crew to reach their lifeboats before ships were sunk. Germany reluctantly stopped sinking passenger liners. However, in January 1917, it decided that a massive infantry attack on the Western Front, coupled with a full-scale attack on all food shipments to Britain, would win the war at last. Berlin realized the resumption of unrestricted submarine warfare almost certainly meant war with the United States, but it calculated that the small American military would take years to mobilize and arrive, when Germany would have already won. Germany reached out to Mexico with the Zimmermann Telegram, offering a military alliance against the United States, hoping that Washington would divert most of its attention to attacking Mexico. London intercepted the telegram, the contents of which outraged American opinion.

=== World War I: United States vs Germany ===
Wilson called on Congress to declare war on Germany in April 1917 in order to make the world "safe for democracy" and defeat militarism and autocracy. Washington expected to provide money, munitions, food, and raw materials but did not expect to send large troop contingents until it realized how weak the Allies were on the Western Front. After the collapse of Russia and its exit from the war in late 1917, Germany could reallocate 600,000 experienced troops to the Western Front. But by summer, American troops were arriving at the rate of 10,000 a day, every day, replacing all the Allied losses while the German Army shrank day by day until it finally collapsed in November 1918. On the home front, the German-American community quietly supported the American effort, but there was much suspicion otherwise. Germany was portrayed as a threat to American freedom and way of life.

Left World War I American poster for enlistment in the U.S. Army

Inside Germany, the United States was treated as just another enemy and denounced as a false liberator that wanted to dominate Europe itself. As the war ended, however, the German people embraced Wilson's 14 points and promises of the just peace treaty. At the Paris Peace Conference of 1919, Wilson used his enormous prestige and co-operated with British Prime Minister David Lloyd George to block some of the harshest French demands against Germany in the Treaty of Versailles. Wilson devoted most of his strength to establishing the League of Nations, which he felt would end all wars. He also signed a treaty with France and Britain to guarantee American support to prevent Germany from invading France again. Wilson refused all compromises with the Republicans, who controlled Congress, and so the United States neither ratified the Treaty of Versailles nor joined the League of Nations.

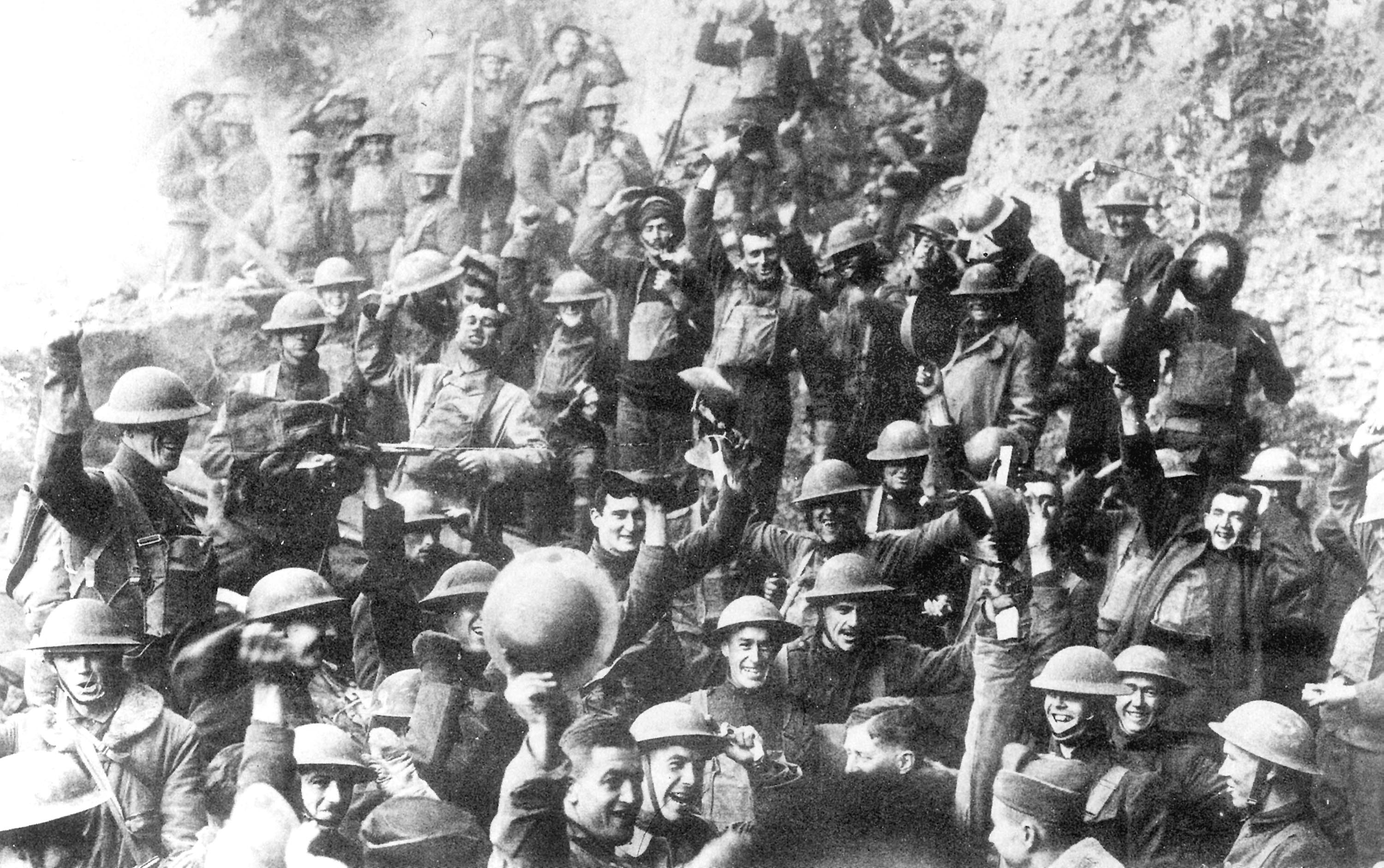
American soldiers of the 64th Regiment, part of the 7th Division, celebrate the news of the Armistice with Germany, November 11, 1918.

German dominance in chemicals and pharmaceuticals meant they controlled critical patents. The Congress abrogated the patents and licensed American companies to manufacture products such as Salvarsan, a major new German drug that could cure syphilis. In similar fashion the German drug company Bayer lost control of its patent—and its very high profits—on the world's most popular drug, aspirin.

=== Interwar period ===
==== 1920s ====
Economic and diplomatic relations were positive during the 1920s. According to Frank Costigliola, Washington and Wall Street sought a prosperous and stable Europe; they felt success depended upon a prosperous Germany. Key players included Wall Street bankers Charles G. Dawes and Owen D. Young, the Federal Reserve Bank of New York, and the first postwar ambassador, Alanson B. Houghton (1922–1925). New York banks played a major role in financing the rebuilding of the German economy. The policy worked after 1923, but depended upon a continuous flow of dollars. That flow largely ended with the start of the Great Depression in 1929.

Washington rejected the harsh anti-German Versailles Treaty of 1920, and instead signed a new peace treaty that involved no punishment for Germany, and worked with Britain to create a viable Euro-Atlantic peace system. Ambassador Houghton believed that peace, European stability, and American prosperity depended upon a reconstruction of Europe's economy and political systems. He saw his role as promoting American political engagement with Europe. He overcame US opposition and lack of interest and quickly realized that the central issues of the day were all entangled in economics, especially war debts owed by the Allies to the United States, reparations owed by Germany to the Allies, worldwide inflation, and international trade and investment. Solutions, he believed, required new US policies and close co-operation with Britain and Germany. He was a leading promoter of the Dawes Plan.

The high culture of Germany looked down upon American culture, The German right was suspicious of modernity, as represented by imported American ideas and tastes. However the younger German generation danced to American jazz. Hollywood had enormous influence on all age groups, with captions in German; after 1929 they flocked to sound films dubbed in German. Henry Ford's model of industrial efficiency attracted attention.

German influence on American society and culture was limited after 1914. The flow of migration into the United States was small, and American scholars rarely attended German universities. The public generally ignored German culture. The American musical elite, according to Geoffrey S. Cahn, was sharply negative toward the atonal and serial compositions of Arnold Schoenberg, Alban Berg, and Paul Hindemith. They denounced it as dissonant and sterile.

==== Nazi era 1933–1941 ====
Public opinion in the US was strongly hostile towards Nazi Germany and Adolf Hitler, but there was a strong aversion to war and to entanglement in European politics. President Franklin D. Roosevelt was preoccupied with implementing domestic New Deal policies to handle the Great Depression and was unfocused on foreign policy. The Roosevelt administration publicly hailed the Munich Agreement of 1938 for avoiding war but privately realized it was only a postponement that called for rapid rearming. Adolf Hitler in the 1920s expressed favorable views of the United States because of immigration restrictions and mistreatment of African-Americans and Native Americans. Historian Jens-Uwe Guettel denies there were any real links between American west and Nazi Germany's eastward expansion. He argues that Hitler rarely mentioned the American West or the extermination of Indians and "the Nazis did not use the settlement of western North America as a model for their occupation, colonization and extermination policies." After he gained power in 1933 Hitler increasingly identified the United States as his main enemy, and became convinced that Jews controlled Roosevelt. According to Jeffrey Herf, "Nazi attitudes towards FDR and the United States went from dubious assertions of common interests, during the New Deal, to growing hostility and then rage." Formal relations were cool until November 1938 and then turned very cold. The key event was American revulsion against Kristallnacht, the nationwide German assault on Jews and their institutions on 9–10 November 1938. Religious groups which had been pacifistic also turned hostile.

While the total flow of refugees from Germany to the US was relatively small during the 1930s, many intellectuals escaped and resettled in the United States. Many were Jewish, including Albert Einstein and Henry Kissinger, but Washington's restrictions on immigration kept out most of the Jews who wanted to come. Catholic universities were strengthened by the arrival of German Catholic intellectuals in exile, such as Waldemar Gurian at the University of Notre Dame.

The American major film studios, with the exception of Warner Bros. Pictures which had a strongly anti-Nazi policy, censored and edited films so that they could be exported to Germany.

=== World War II ===
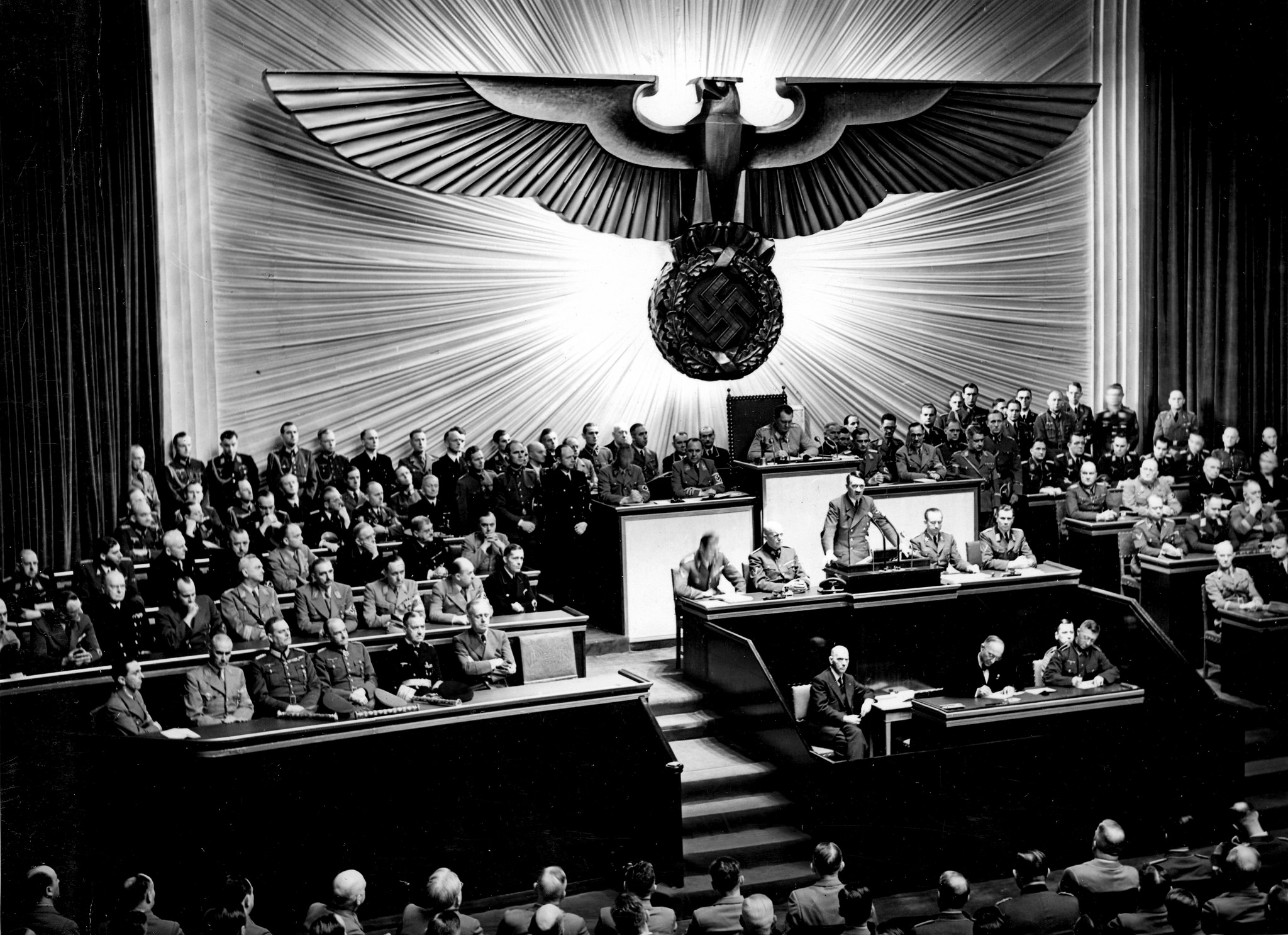
Adolf Hitler's Declaration of war on The United States Speech (December 11, 1941)

When World War II began with the German invasion of Poland in September 1939, the US was officially neutral until December 11, 1941, when Germany declared war on the US and Washington followed suit in The Aftermath of Japan's attack on Pearl Harbor. Roosevelt's foreign policy had strongly favored Britain and France over Germany in 1939 to 1941. In 1940–1941, before the US entered the war officially, there was a massive buildup of American armaments, as well as the first peacetime draft for young men. Public opinion was bitterly divided, with isolationism strong at first but growing weaker month by month. German-Americans rarely supported Nazi Germany, but most called for American neutrality, as they had done in 1914–1917. The attack on Pearl Harbor evoked strong pro-American patriotic sentiments among German Americans, few of whom by then had contacts with distant relatives in the old country.

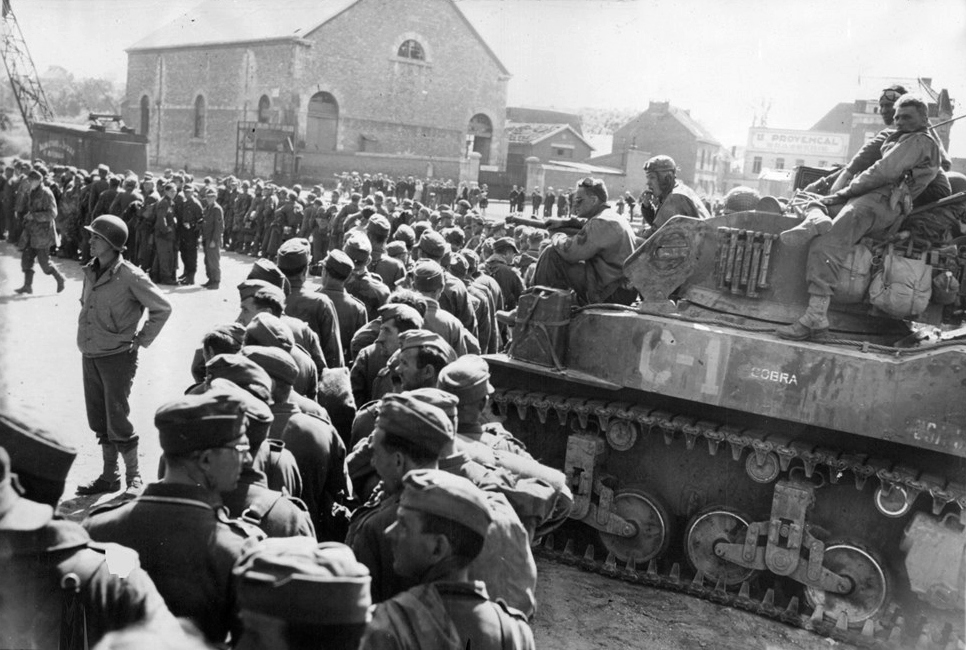
Crewmen of a U.S. tank watch a long column of Germans captured in Belgium, 1944

Roosevelt was determined to avoid the mistakes made during the First World War. He made deliberate efforts to suppress anti-German-American sentiments. Private companies sometimes refused to hire any non-citizen, or American citizens of German or Italian ancestry. This threatened the morale of loyal Americans. Roosevelt considered this "stupid" and "unjust". In June 1941 he issued Executive Order 8802 and set up the Fair Employment Practice Committee, which also protected Blacks, Jews and other minorities.

President Roosevelt sought out Americans of German ancestry for top war jobs, including General Dwight D. Eisenhower, Admiral Chester W. Nimitz, and General Carl Andrew Spaatz. He appointed Republican Wendell Willkie as a personal representative; Willkie, the son of German immigrants, had been his Republican opponent in the 1940 election. German Americans who had fluent German language skills were an important asset to wartime intelligence, and they served as translators and as spies for the United States.

"Liberators", Nazi propaganda poster from 1944 brings together Nazi ridicule of American culture.

The US played a central role in the defeat of the Axis powers and Hitler was bitterly anti-American. Berlin attacked American participation with extensive propaganda value. The notorious "LIBERATORS" poster from 1944, shown here, was a revealing example: It depicts America as a monstrous, vicious war machine seeking to destroy European culture. The poster alludes to many negative aspects of American history, including the Ku Klux Klan, the oppression of Native Americans, and the lynching of blacks. The poster condemns American capitalism and says America is controlled by Jews. It shows American bombs destroying a helpless European village. Roosevelt was cautious about propaganda. The Nazis were targets, not the German people. In sharp contrast with 1917, atrocity stories were avoided.

=== Cold War ===
Following the defeat of the Third Reich, American forces were one of the occupation powers in postwar Germany. In parallel to denazification and "industrial disarmament" American citizens fraternized with Germans. The Berlin Airlift from 1948 to 1949 and the Marshall Plan (1948–1952) further improved the Germans' perception of Americans.

==== West Germany ====
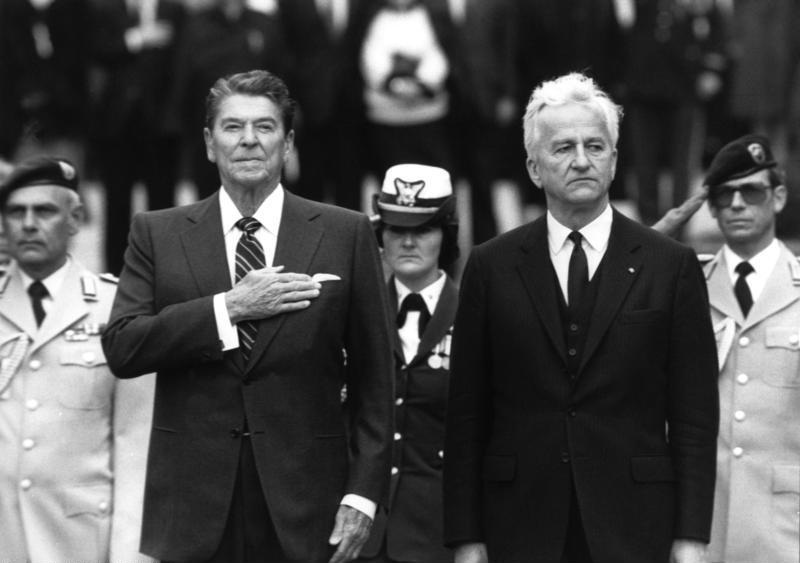
Ronald Reagan meeting with Richard von Weizsäcker, in Bonn, May 2, 1985.

The emergence of the Cold War made the Federal Republic of Germany (West Germany) the frontier of a democratic Western Europe and American military presence became an integral part in West German society. During the Cold War, West Germany developed into the largest economy in Europe and West German-US relations developed into a new transatlantic partnership. Germany and the US shared a large portion of their culture, established intensive global trade environment, and continued to co-operate on new high technologies. However, tensions remained between differing approaches on both sides of the Atlantic. The fall of the Berlin Wall and the subsequent German reunification marked a new era in German-American co-operation.

==== East Germany ====
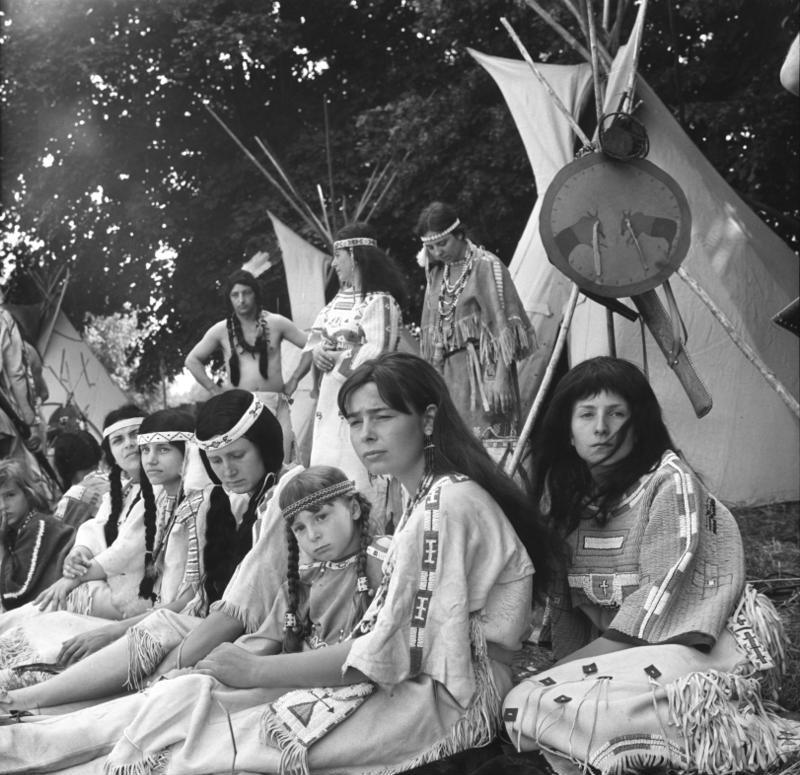
Interessengemeinschaft Mandan-Indianer Leipzig 1970, the popular image of Native Americans made Indian living history quite popular in communist East Germany

Relations between the United States and East Germany were hostile. The United States followed Konrad Adenauer's Hallstein Doctrine, which declared that recognition of East Germany by any country would be treated as an unfriendly act by West Germany. Relations between the two German state thawed somewhat in the 1970s, as part of Détente between East and West and the 'Ostpolitik' policies of the Brandt government. United States recognized East Germany officially in September 1974, when Erich Honecker was the leader of the ruling Socialist Unity Party.

Map showing the division of East and West Germany until 1990, with West Berlin in yellow.

=== Reunification (1989–90) ===
President George H. W. Bush (1989–1993) played a large part by his constant support of unification, and several US historians argue that Bush had a significant role in ensuring the unified Germany committed to NATO. While Britain and France were wary of a re-unified Germany, Bush strongly supported West German Chancellor Helmut Kohl in pushing for rapid German reunification in 1990. Bush believed that a reunified Germany would serve U.S. interests, but he also saw reunification as providing a final symbolic end to World War II. After extensive negotiations, Soviet President Mikhail Gorbachev agreed to allow a reunified Germany to be a part of NATO under the condition that the former territory of the German Democratic Republic would not be remiliterised, and Germany officially reunified in October 1990. This was a situation previously considered unthinkable, given the previous status of the Soviet Union, but it was made feasible by the time of the fall of the East German regime. Bush paid attention to domestic public opinion. Serious doubts about reunification were voiced by the Jewish-American and Polish-American communities—whose families had suffered immensely from Nazism. However, the largely positive public opinion towards German unification in the United States generally corresponded to the sentiments of the usually passive German-American community.

=== Reunified Germany ===
During the early 1990s, the reunified Germany was called a "partnership in leadership" as the US emerged as the world's sole superpower. Germany's effort to incorporate any major military actions into the European Union's slowly-progressing Common Security and Defence Policy did not meet the expectations of the U.S. during the Gulf War of 1990–1991.

=== Since 2001 ===
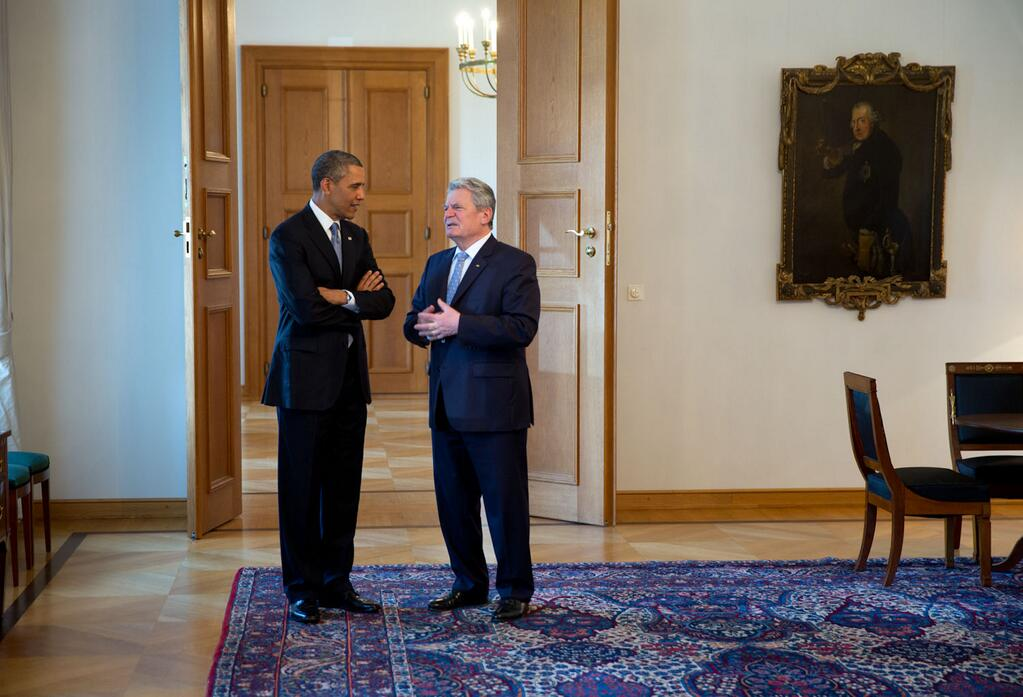
U.S. President Barack Obama with German President Joachim Gauck in Berlin, June 2013

After the September 11 attacks in 2001, German-American political relations were strengthened in an effort to combat terrorism, and Germany sent troops to Afghanistan as part of the NATO force. Yet, discord continued over the Iraq War, when German Chancellor Gerhard Schröder and Foreign Minister Joschka Fischer made efforts to prevent war and did not join the US and the UK, which both led multinational force in Iraq. Anti-Americanism rose to the surface after the attacks of 11 September 2001 as hostile German intellectuals argued there were ugly links between globalization, Americanization, and terrorism.

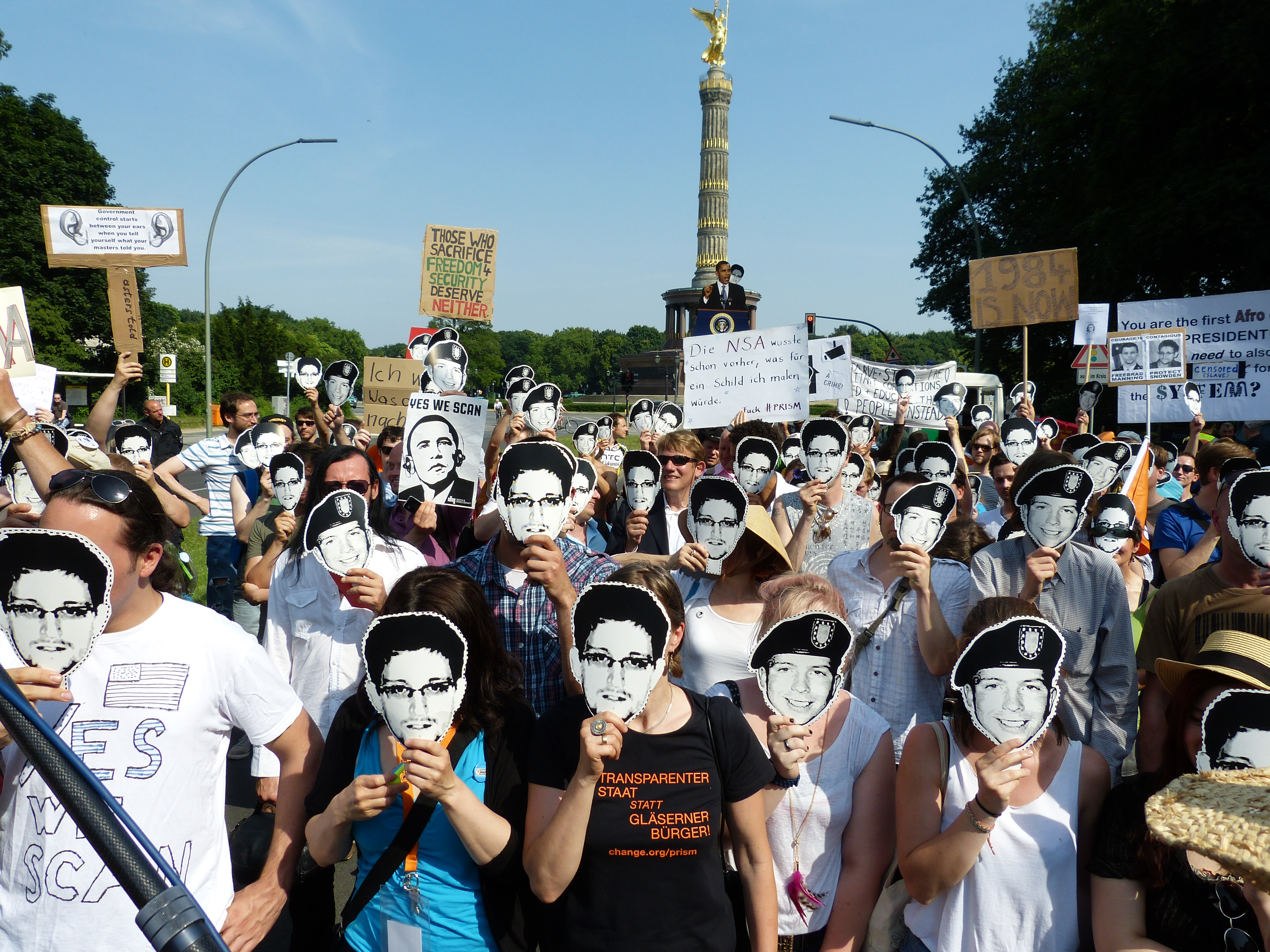
Protestors rally against National Security Agency's mass surveillance, Berlin, June 2013

In response to the 2013 mass surveillance disclosures, in which it was revealed that the NSA may have wiretapped major German institutions, including the phone line of Chancellor Merkel, Germany cancelled the 1968 intelligence sharing agreement with the US and UK. New cases of spying on Germany by US agents are subsequently revealed.

Longstanding close relations with the United States flourished especially under the Obama Administration (2009–2017). In 2016 President Barack Obama hailed Chancellor Angela Merkel as his "closest international partner."

However relations worsened dramatically during the Trump administration (2017–2021), especially regarding NATO funding, trade, tariffs, and Germany's energy dependence upon the Russian Federation. In May 2017, Merkel met Donald Trump, the paternal grandson of German immigrants. His statements that the U.S. had been taken advantage of in trade deals during previous administrations had already strained relations with several EU countries and other American allies. Without mentioning Trump specifically, Merkel said after a NATO summit "The times when we could completely rely on others are, to an extent, over," This came after Trump had said "The Germans are bad, very bad" and "See the millions of cars they are selling to the U.S. Terrible. We will stop this."

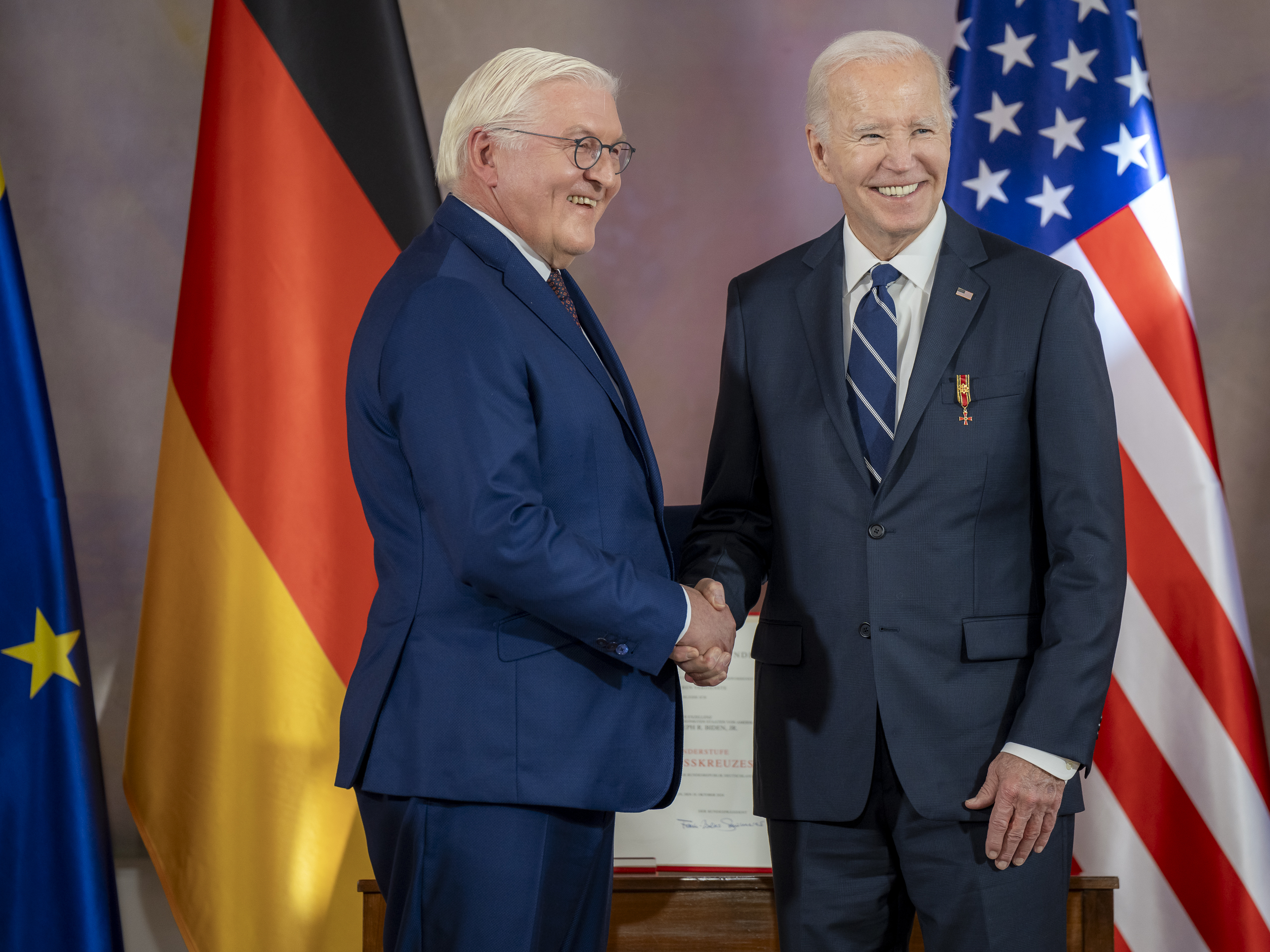
President Steinmeier presents the Order of Merit of the Federal Republic of Germany Award to President Biden, 2024

In 2021 talks and meetings with Merkel and other European leaders, President Joe Biden spoke of bilateral relations, bolstering transatlantic relations through NATO and the European Union, and closely coordinating on key issues, such as Iran, China, Russia, Afghanistan, climate change, the COVID-19 pandemic and multilateral organizations. In early February 2021, Biden froze the Trump administration's withdrawal of 9,500 troops from U.S. military bases in Germany. Biden's freeze was welcomed by Berlin, which said that the move "serves European and transatlantic security and hence is in our mutual interest."

Merkel met Biden in Washington on July 15, 2021, with an agenda covering COVID-19 pandemic, global warming and economic issues. Trump's opposition to the $11 billion Nord Stream 2 gas pipeline remained an unresolved issue under Biden.

On February 15, 2025, Olaf Scholz slammed JD Vance’s calls to end political "firewalls" against the far-right Alternative for Germany (AfD) party, condemning U.S. interference in Germany's democracy. Speaking at the Munich Security Conference, he argued that supporting the AfD contradicted lessons from Germany's Nazi past. Vance, who met AfD candidate Alice Weidel but not Scholz, criticized Europe's establishment and called for stricter migration policies. With Germany's election a week away, center-right frontrunner Friedrich Merz also told Vance to back off and criticized Donald Trump for banning AP from White House coverage.

== Perceptions and values in the two countries ==
The exploits of gunslingers on the American frontier played a major role in American folklore, fiction and film. The same stories became immensely popular in Germany, which produced its own novels and films about the American frontier. Karl May (1842–1912) was a German writer best known for his adventure novels set in the American Old West. His main protagonists are Winnetou and Old Shatterhand. The German fascination with Amerindians dates to the early 19th century, with a volumous literature. Typical writings focus on "Indianness" and authenticity.

Germany and the US are civil societies. Germany's philosophical heritage and American spirit for "freedom" interlock to a central aspect of Western culture and Western civilization. Even though developed under different geographical settings, the Age of Enlightenment is fundamental to the self-esteem and understanding of both nations.

The American-led invasion of Iraq changed the perception of the US in Germany significantly. A 2013 BBC World Service poll shows found that 35% find American influence to be positive while 39% view it to be negative. Both countries differ in many key areas, such as energy and military intervention.

A survey conducted on behalf of the German embassy in 2007 showed that Americans continued to regard Germany's failure to support the war in Iraq as the main irritant in relations between the two nations. The issue was of declining importance, however, and Americans still considered Germany to be their fourth most important international partner behind the United Kingdom, Canada and Japan. Americans considered economic cooperation to be the most positive aspect of US-German relations with a much smaller role played by Germany in U.S. politics.

Among the nations of Western Europe, German public perception of the US is unusual in that it has continually fluctuated back and forth from fairly positive in 2002 (60%), to considerably negative in 2007 (30%), back to mildly positive in 2012 (52%), and back to considerably negative in 2017 (35%) reflecting the sharply polarized and mixed feelings of the German people for the United States. According to a 2025 YouGov poll, 55% of Germans predicts tensions with the United States as a major or moderate threat to continental peace.

According to findings from the Pew Research Center and Körber-Stiftung in 2021 Americans considered Germany to be their fifth most important foreign policy partner, while Germans in turn regarded the US as their most important partner. According to a 2026 Gallup poll, 75% of Americans have favorable opinions of Germany, while 19% have an unfavorable opinion. According to a 2026 Pew Research Center survey, 27% of Germans had a favorable view of the United States, while 71% had a negative view.

=== Hostilities and tensions ===
German observers took a keen interest in American race relations, especially the inferior status of Blacks in the South. Visitors stressed the incongruity of American democratic ideals and the system of segregation prevalent before 1965.

While musical connoisseurs deplored the low state of classical music in America, dixieland black jazz music became popular with youth in Berlin and other cities in the 1920s. Germans came to appreciate country music in the 1950s. During World War I, German compositions were dropped from the classical music repertoire temporarily. Dr. Karl Muck, conductor of the Boston Symphony Orchestra, was arrested and deported in 1919. The Metropolitan Opera in New York City restored Wagner's "Ring cycle" in 1924.

In the postwar era 1945–1970, as the United States helped rebuild West Germany, anti-Americanism was weak. However, in the late 1960s, West Germany's youth contrasted the images of Woodstock—which they liked—and Vietnam—which they hated. Young rebels turned to violence to destroy the foundations of a society that backed American cultural imperialism. Anti-Americanism reappeared among intellectuals after the attacks on 11 September 2001 because some of them linked globalization, Americanization, and terrorism. The war in Iraq in 2003 was highly unpopular at all levels of German society.

During the Cold War, anti-Americanism was the official government policy in East Germany, and pro-American dissenters were punished. In West Germany, anti-Americanism was the common position on the left, but a majority of the population held positive views towards the United States. Germany's refusal to support the American-led invasion of Iraq in 2003 was often seen in the United States itself as a manifestation of anti-Americanism.

Anti-Americanism had been muted on the right since 1945, but reemerged in the 21st century especially in the Alternative for Germany (AfD) party that began in opposition to European Union, and now has become both anti-American and anti-immigrant. Annoyance or distrust of the Americans was heightened in 2013 by revelations of American spying on top German officials, including Chancellor Angela Merkel.

== Military relations ==
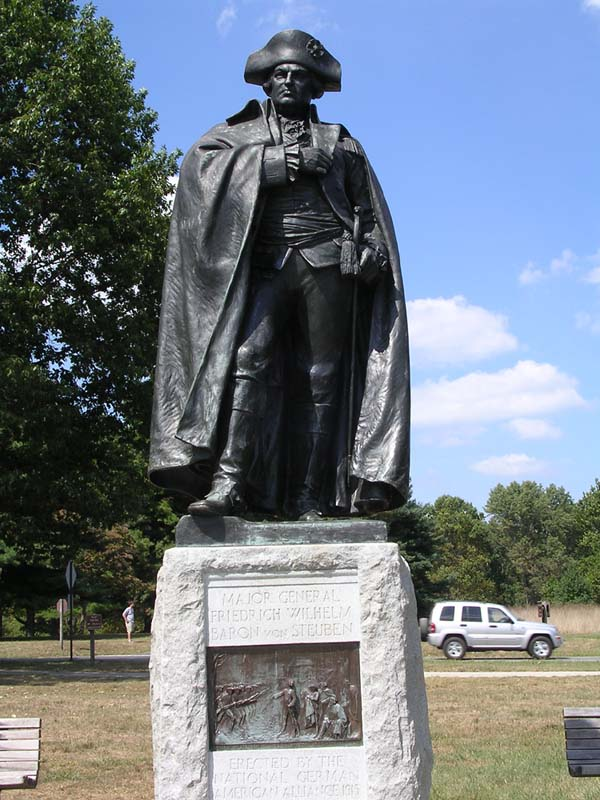
Statue of General von Steuben at Valley Forge in Pennsylvania

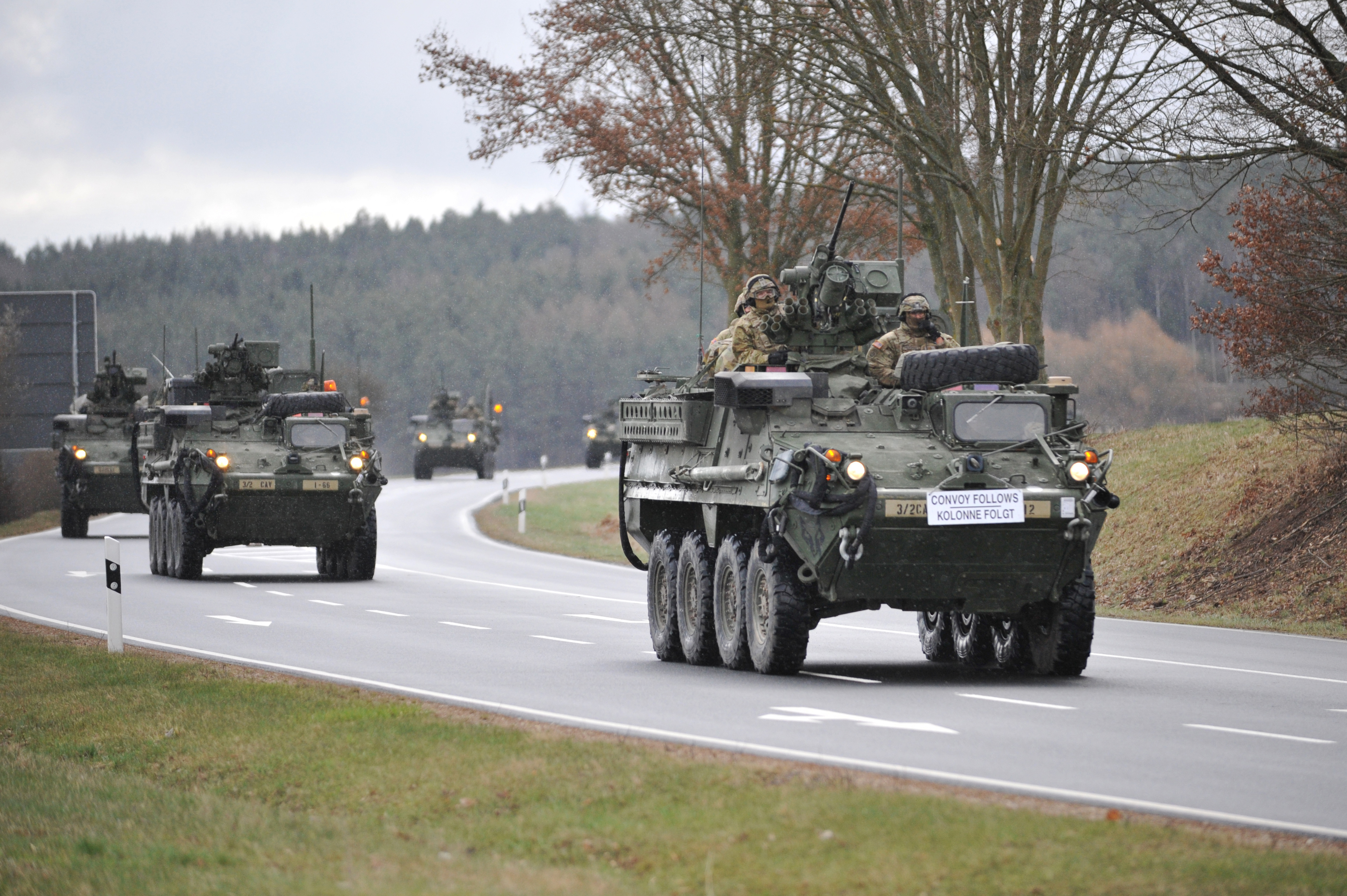
U.S. Army 3rd Squadron, 2nd Cavalry Regiment soldiers returning to their garrison in Vilseck during Operation Dragoon Ride in 2015.

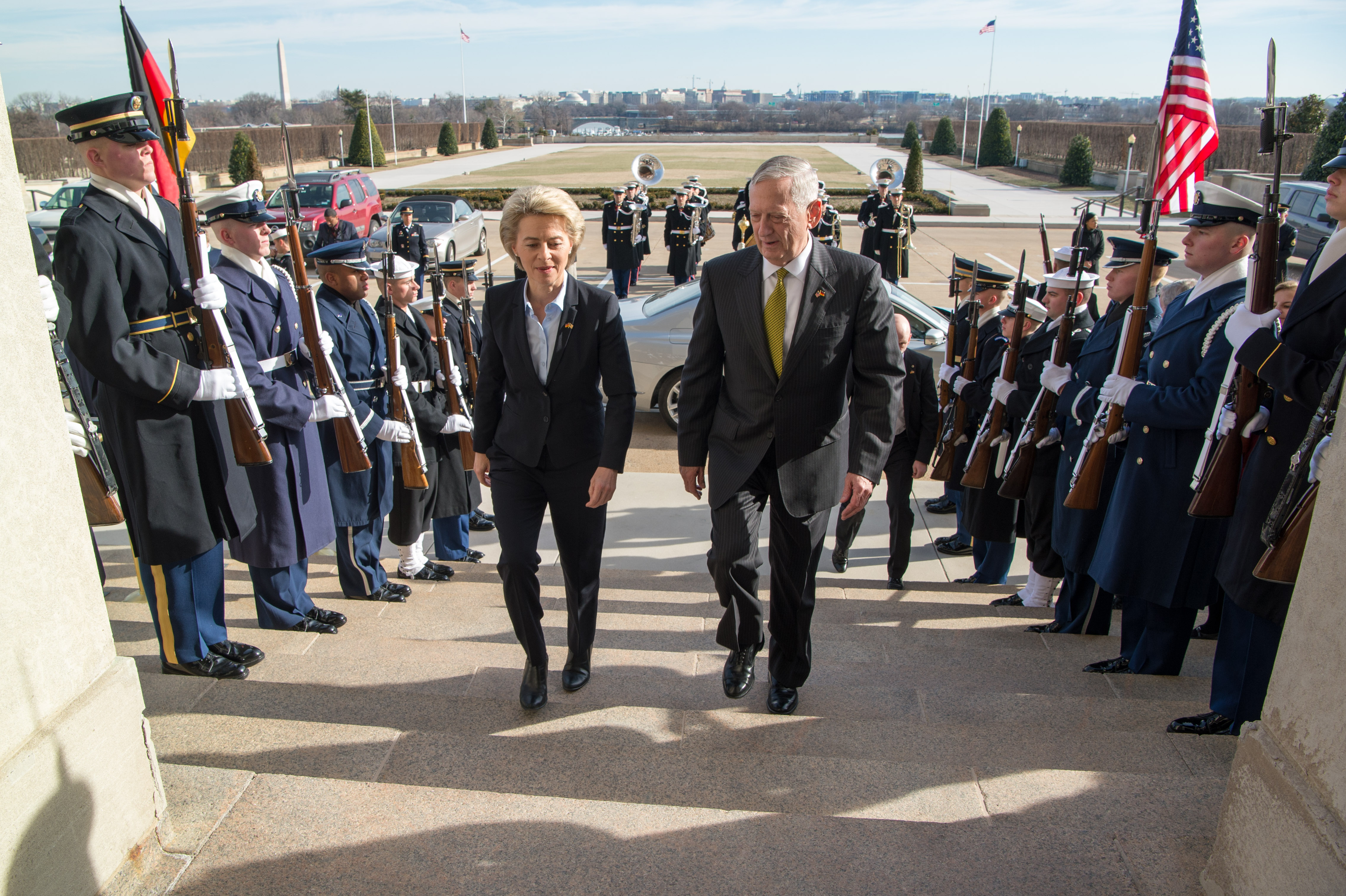
Defence ministers James Mattis (U.S.) and Ursula von der Leyen (Germany) meeting in Washington, DC

=== History ===
German-American military relations began in the American Revolution when German troops fought on both sides. Friedrich Wilhelm von Steuben, a former captain in the Prussian Army, was appointed Inspector General of the Continental Army and played the major role in training American soldiers to the best European standards. Von Steuben is considered to be one of the founding fathers of the United States Army.

Another German that served during the American Revolution was Major General Johann de Kalb, who served under Horatio Gates at the Battle of Camden and died as a result of several wounds he sustained during the fighting.

About 30,000 German mercenaries fought for the British, with 17,000 hired from Hesse, about one in four of the adult male population of the principality. The Hessians fought under their own officers under British command. Leopold Philip de Heister, Wilhelm von Knyphausen, and Baron Friedrich Wilhelm von Lossberg were the principal generals who commanded these troops with Frederick Christian Arnold, Freiherr von Jungkenn as the senior German officer.

German Americans have been very influential in the American military. Some notable figures include Brigadier General August Kautz, Major General Franz Sigel, General of the Armies John J. Pershing, General of the Army Dwight D. Eisenhower, Fleet Admiral Chester Nimitz, and General Norman Schwarzkopf, Jr.

=== Today ===
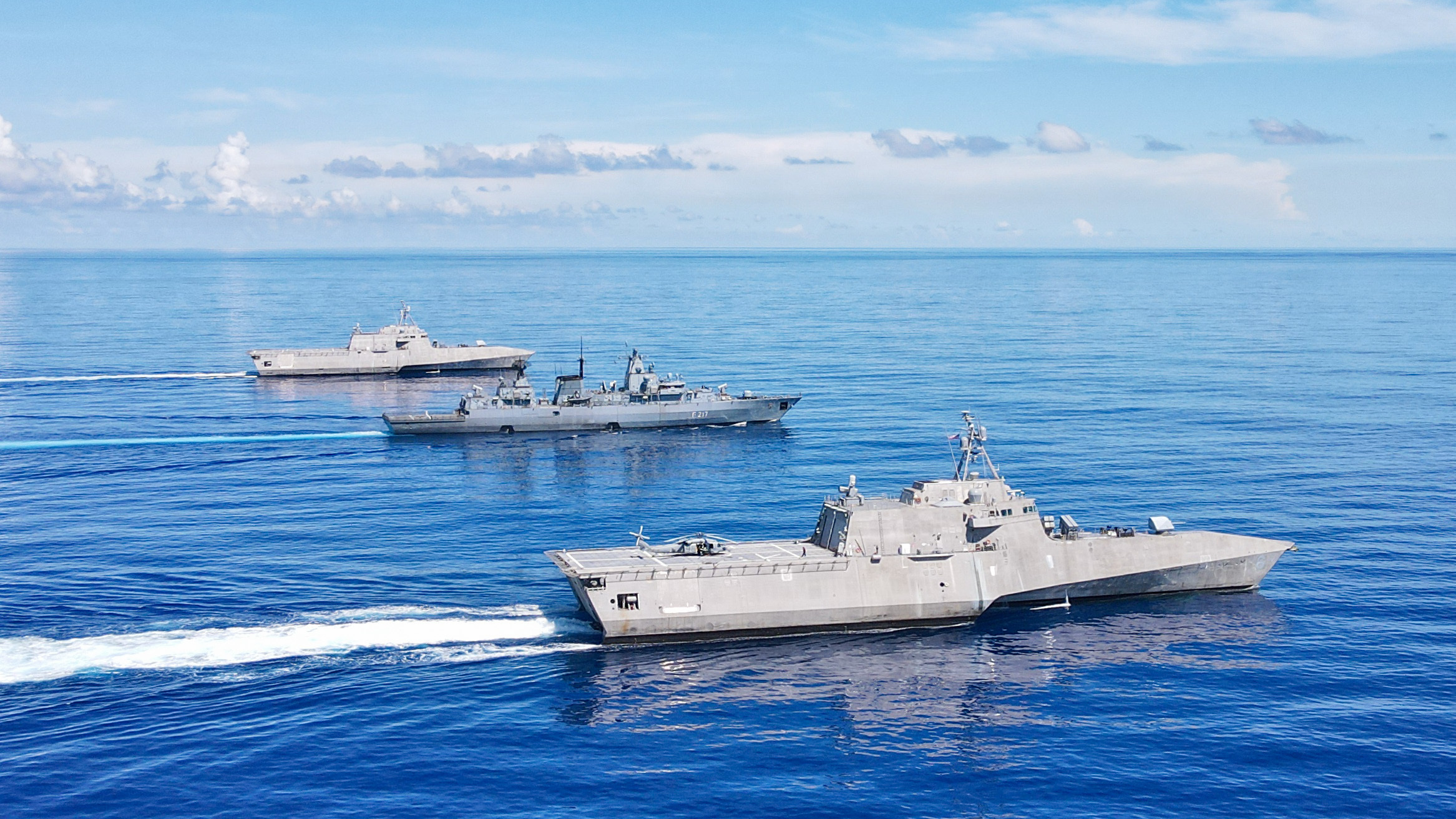
US Navy ships USS Tulsa (LCS-16) (left) and USS Jackson (LCS-6) (right) conduct a joint exercise with German frigate FGS Bayern (F-217) (center) in the Philippine Sea in 2021

The United States established a permanent military presence in Germany at the end of the Second World War that continued throughout the Cold War, with a peak level of over 274,000 U.S. troops stationed in Germany in 1962, and was drawn down in the early 21st century. The last American tanks were withdrawn from Germany in 2013, but they returned the following year to address a gap in multinational training opportunities. The U.S. had 35,000 American troops in Germany in 2017.

Germany and the United States are joint NATO members. Both nations have cooperated closely in the war on terror, for which Germany provided more troops than any other nation. Germany hosts the headquarters of the US Africa Command and the Ramstein Air Base, a U.S. Air Force base.

The two nations had opposing public policy positions in the war in Iraq; Germany blocked US efforts to secure UN resolutions in the buildup to war, but Germany quietly supported some US interests in southwest Asia. German soldiers operated military biological and chemical cleanup equipment at Camp Doha in Kuwait; German Navy ships secured sea lanes to deter attacks by Al Qaeda on U.S. Forces and equipment in the Persian Gulf; and soldiers from Germany's Bundeswehr deployed all across southern Germany to US military bases to conduct force protection duties in place of German-based U.S. Soldiers who were deployed to the Iraq War. The latter mission lasted from 2002 until 2006, by which time nearly all these Bundeswehr were demobilized. U.S. soldiers wounded in Iraq received medical treatment at the Landstuhl Regional Medical Center, a US military hospital located in Rheinland Pfalz.

In March 2019, Trump was reportedly drafting a demand several countries, including Germany, to pay the United States 150% of the cost of the American troops deployed on their soil. The proposed demand was criticized by experts. Douglas Lute, a retired general and former US ambassador to NATO, said that Trump was using "a misinformed narrative that these facilities are there for the benefits of those countries. The truth is they're there and we maintain them because they're in our interest."

In a sharp deterioration of relations, in summer 2020, Washington announced plans to significantly cut the number of US military personnel stationed in Germany, from 34,500 to 25,000. Members of the German government criticized the move, calling it "unacceptable" and stating that current US-German relations are "complicated." President Trump told reporters that US troops:

are there to protect Germany, right? And Germany is supposed to pay for it....Germany’s not paying for it. We don’t want to be the suckers any more. The United States has been taken advantage of for 25 years, both on trade and on the military. So we’re reducing the force because they’re not paying their bills.

As of August 2020, the plan was to move 11,900 troops out of Germany and reassign them elsewhere in Europe, either immediately or after first returning them to the United States for a while. The movement is estimated to cost billions of dollars. In February 2021 President Biden decided to freeze the withdrawal of the troops initiated by his predecessor for further review of the troop deployment around the world.

In July 2024, the Biden administration announced its intention to deploy long-range missiles in Germany starting in 2026. US weapons in Germany would include SM-6 and Tomahawk cruise missiles and hypersonic weapons. The United States' decision to deploy long-range missiles in Germany has been compared to the deployment of Pershing II launchers in Western Europe in 1979. Critics say the move would trigger a new arms race.

An August 2020, Yougov poll found that 47% of Germans in favor of a 12,000 American troop reduction, 32% supported keeping the current number, 4% wanted a increase. 25% in the poll supported a full US armed forces withdrawal in Germany.

== Espionage ==
As the Iron Curtain ran through the middle of Germany during the Cold War, divided Germany was an important center of US espionage activities. US intelligence agencies monitored the politics of the Federal Republic of Germany as well as conducting espionage and propaganda against the Eastern Bloc. The CIA and other American intelligence services worked closely with the West German BND. Even after German reunification, a significant American intelligence presence in Germany remained. In 2013, the global surveillance and espionage affair revealed that the American NSA had eavesdropped on and spied on almost all top German politicians, including Chancellor Angela Merkel. The revelations also brought to light that the CIA had informants in politics and the security services of Germany. The US has a surveillance capacity on German soil that far exceeds that of the German security services. This is also demonstrated by the fact that numerous terrorist attacks in Germany have been prevented by information from US intelligence. There is therefore a great deal of dependence on the German side in the fight against terrorism. The German BND cooperated with the NSA on the mass surveillance of German citizens.

According to estimates from 2010, around 120 CIA agents were working in Germany, often disguised as diplomats. They were mainly active in the American embassy in Berlin and the consulates in Munich and Frankfurt. For a long time, the CIA headquarters in Frankfurt was located in the I.G. Farben building, which was occupied by the US in World War II. According to revelations WikiLeaks platform in 2017, there is a secret hacker unit called Vault 7 in the US consulate in Frankfurt, which is responsible for Europe, the Middle East and Africa. Wiesbaden is home to the US Army's Consolidated Intelligence Center, which was built in 2015 and is also to be used by the NSA. The espionage center is located near the traffic-intensive DE-CIX internet hub. The US bases in the country are extraterritorial and are therefore subject to US law.

== Economic relations ==
U.S. trade deficit (in billions, goods only) by country in 2014

Economic relations between Germany and the United States are very important. The Transatlantic Economic Partnership between the US and the EU, which was launched in 2007 on Germany's initiative, and the subsequently created Transatlantic Economic Council open up additional opportunities. The US is Germany's principal trading partner outside the EU and Germany is the US's most important trading partner in Europe. In terms of the total volume of U.S. bilateral trade (imports and exports), Germany remains in fourth place, behind Canada, China and Mexico. The US ranks fourth among Germany's trading partners, after the Netherlands, China and France. In 2023, bilateral trade was worth $236 billion.

Germany-United States goods trade in billions of U.S. dollars (1985−2023)
	1985	1990	1995	2000	2005	2010	2015	2020	2023
US exports to Germany	9.1	18.8	22.4	29.4	34.2	48.2	50.0	58.0	76.7
US imports from Germany	20.2	28.2	36.8	58.5	84.8	82.5	124.9	114.9	159.3
Trade balance	−11.2	−9.4	−14.4	−29.1	−50.6	−34.3	−74.9	−56.9	−82.6

Germany and the US are important to each other as investment destinations. At the end of 2012, bilateral investment was worth $320 billion, German direct investment in the US amounting to $266billion and U.S. direct investment in Germany $121 billion. At the end of 2012, US direct investment in Germany stood at approximately $121 billion, an increase of nearly 14% over the previous year (approximately $106 billion). During the same period, German direct investment in the US amounted to some $199 billion, below the previous year's level (approximately $215 billion). Germany is the second largest foreign investor in the US, only after the United Kingdom, and ranks third as a destination for US foreign direct investment. The 5800 German companies in the United States employ around 924,000 people there.

== Cultural relations ==
Karl May was a prolific German writer who specialized in writing Westerns. Although he visited America only once towards the end of his life, May was well known for his series of frontier novels, which provided Germans with an imaginary view of America.

Notable German-American architects, artist, musicians and writers include:

- Josef Albers, artist and educator
- Albert Bierstadt, known for his lavish, sweeping landscapes of the American West
- Philip K. Dick, writer
- Walter Gropius, architect
- Albert Kahn, architect
- Ludwig Mies van der Rohe, architect
- Paul Hindemith, composer
- Philip Johnson, architect
- Otto Klemperer, conductor
- Henry Miller, writer
- Les Paul, guitarist
- Carl Schurz, politician and writer
- Dr. Seuss, writer and illustrator
- Alfred Stieglitz, photographer
- Kurt Vonnegut, writer

A German-American Friendship Garden was built in Washington, D.C., and stands as a symbol of the positive and co-operative relations between the United States and the Federal Republic of Germany. It is on the historic axis between the White House and the Washington Monument on the National Mall, the garden borders Constitution Avenue between 15th and 17th Streets, where an estimated seven million visitors pass each year. The garden features plants native to both Germany and the United States and provides seating and cooling fountains. Commissioned to commemorate the 300th anniversary of German immigration to America, the garden was dedicated on November 15, 1988.

According to German Federal Statistics, currently 520.422 people are living in the US, who are born in Germany, but the number of citizens is estimated at 200.000. There are currently around 300,000 American citizens living in Germany.

== Research and academia ==
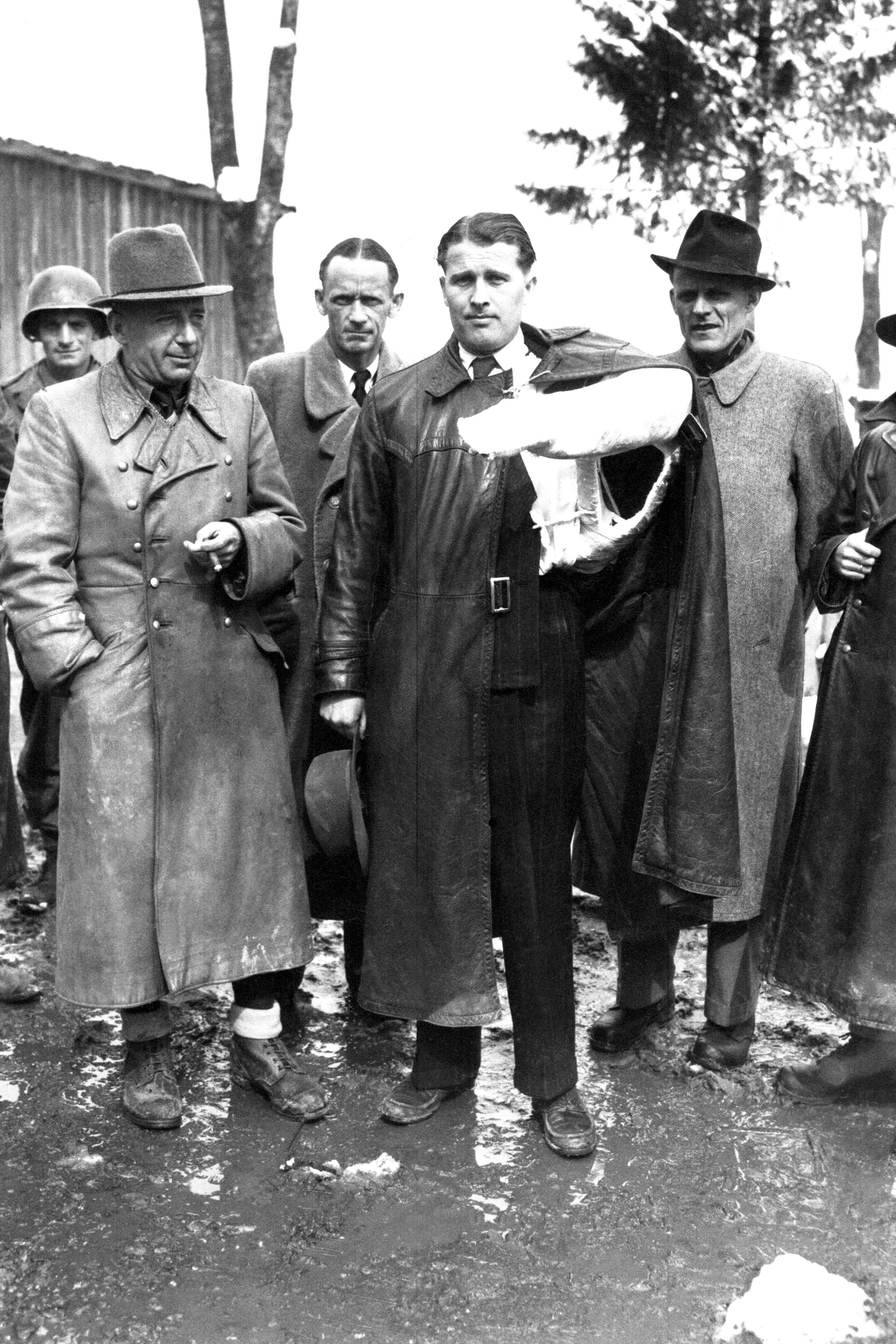
Von Braun, with his arm in a cast from a car accident, surrendered to the Americans just before this May 3, 1945, photo.

Following the Nazi rise to power in 1933, and in particular the passing of the Law for the Restoration of the Professional Civil Service which removed opponents and persons with one Jewish grandparent from government positions (including academia), hundreds of physicists and other academics fled Germany and many came to the United States. James Franck and Albert Einstein were among the more notable scientists who ended up in the United States. Many of the physicists who fled were subsequently instrumental in the wartime Manhattan Project to develop the nuclear bomb. Following the World War II, some of these academics returned to Germany but many remained in the United States.

After WWII and during the Cold War, Operation Paperclip was a secret United States Joint Intelligence Objectives Agency (JIOA) program in which more than 1,600 German scientists, engineers, and technicians (many of whom were formerly registered members of the Nazi Party and some of whom had leadership roles in the Nazi Party), including Wernher von Braun's rocket team, were recruited and brought to the United States for government employment from post-Nazi Germany. Wernher von Braun, who built the German V-2 rockets, and his team of scientists came to the United States and were central in building the American space exploration program.

Researchers at German and American universities run various exchange programs and projects, and focus on space exploration, the International Space Station, environmental technology, and medical science. Import cooperations are also in the fields of biochemistry, engineering, information and communication technologies and life sciences (networks through: Bacatec, DAAD). The United States and Germany signed a bilateral Agreement on Science and Technology Cooperation in February 2010.

== American cultural institutions in Germany ==
In the postwar era, a number of institutions, devoted to highlighting American culture and society in Germany, were established and are in existence today, especially in the south of Germany, the area of the former U.S. Occupied Zone. They offer English courses as well as cultural programs.

== Resident diplomatic missions ==
Resident diplomatic missions of Germany in the United States

- Washington, D.C. (Embassy)
- Atlanta (Consulate-General)
- Boston (Consulate-General)
- Chicago (Consulate-General)
- Houston (Consulate-General)
- Los Angeles (Consulate-General)
- Miami (Consulate-General)
- New York City (Consulate-General)
- San Francisco (Consulate-General)

Resident diplomatic missions of the United States in Germany

- Berlin (Embassy)
- Düsseldorf (Consulate-General)
- Frankfurt (Consulate-General)
- Hamburg (Consulate-General)
- Leipzig (Consulate-General)
- Munich (Consulate-General)

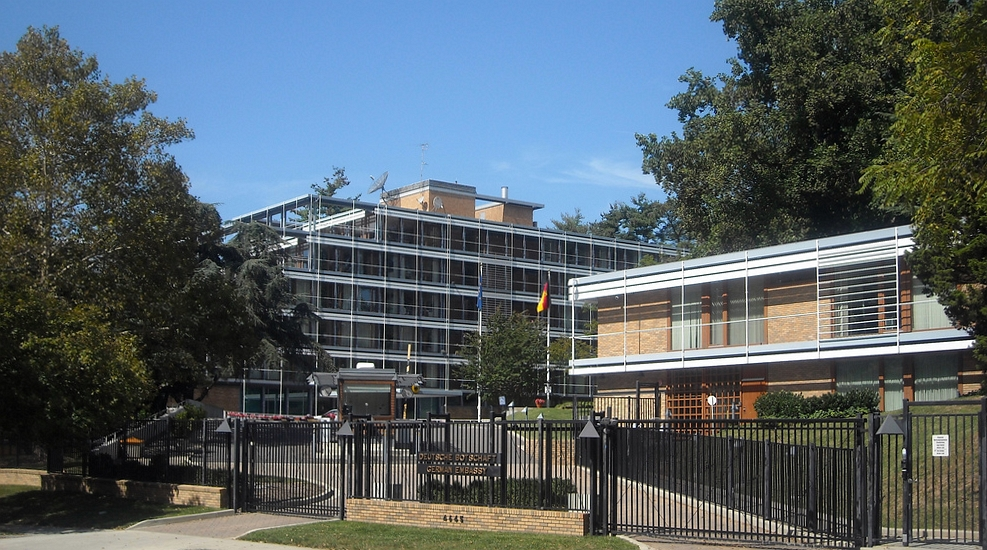
Embassy of Germany in Washington, D.C.

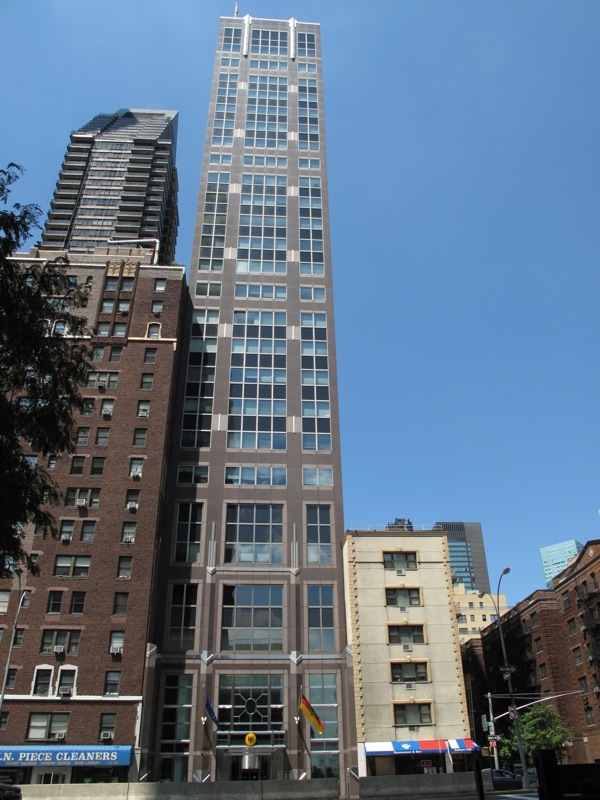
Consulate-General of Germany in New York City

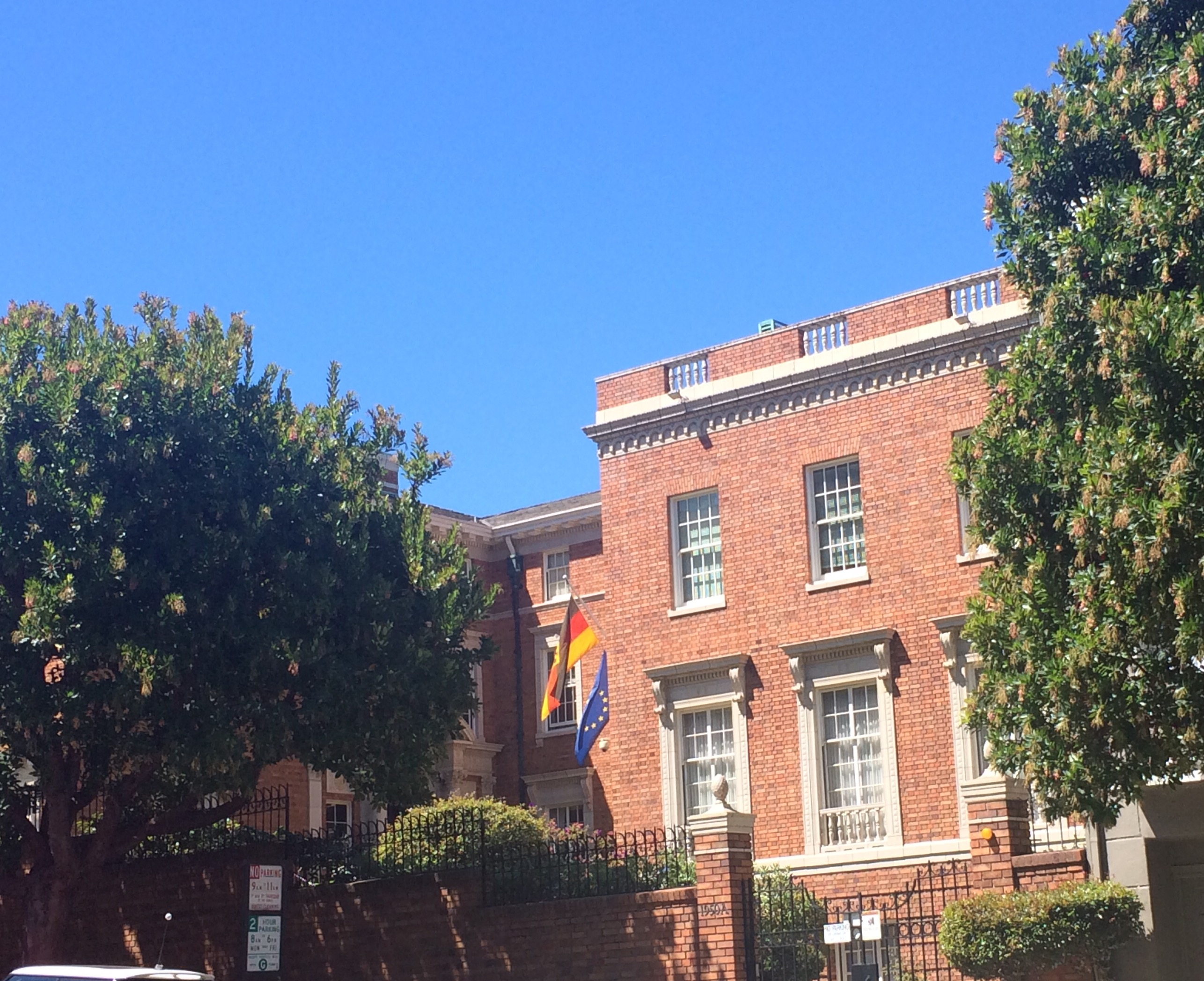
Consulate-General of Germany in San Francisco
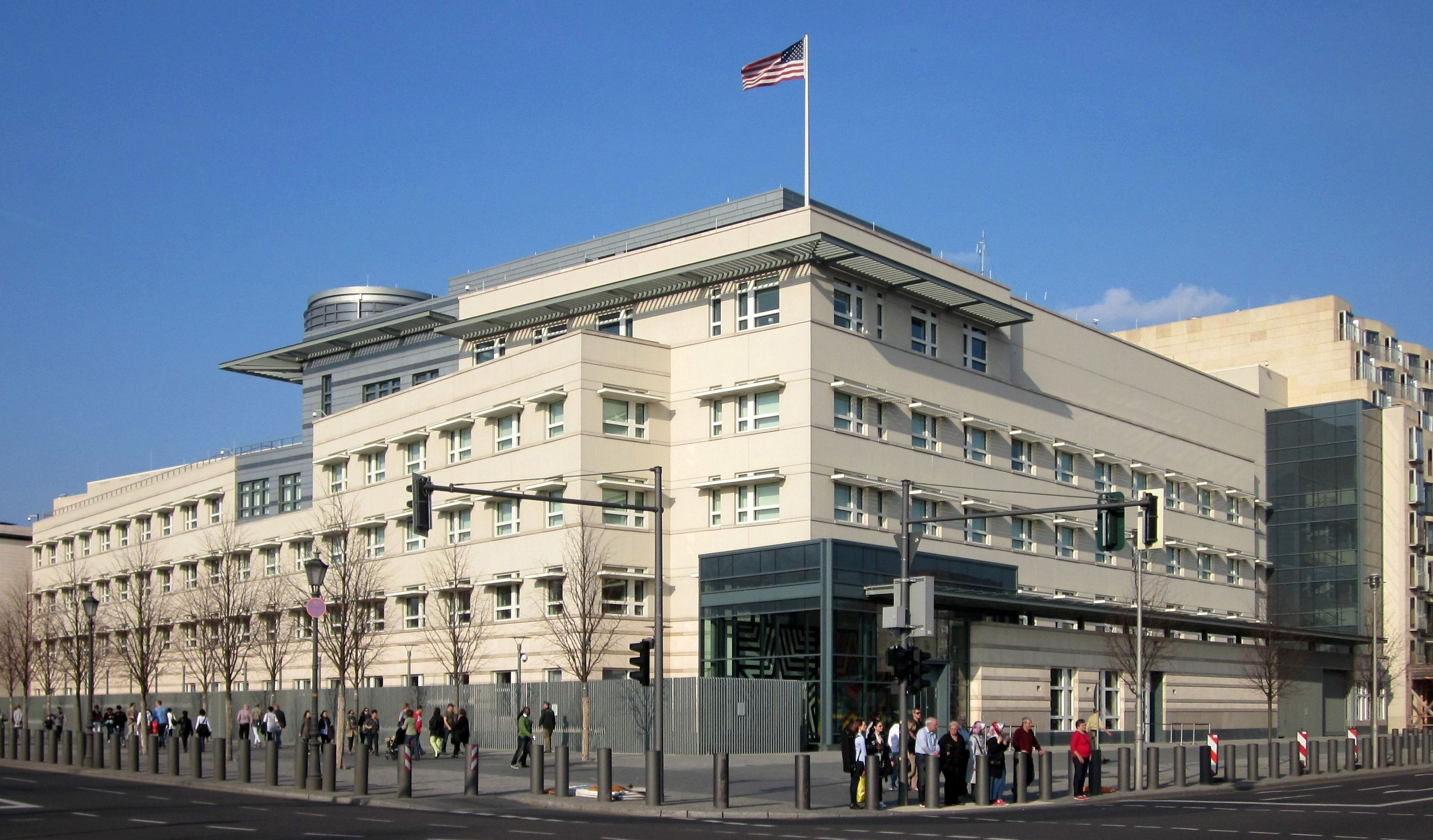
Embassy of the United States in Berlin

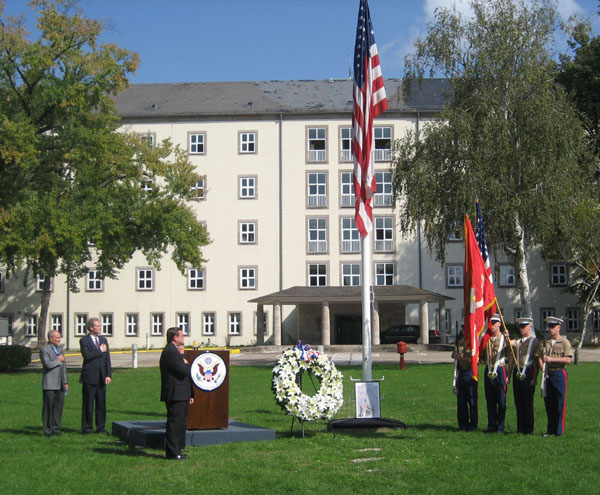
Consulate-General of the United States in Frankfurt

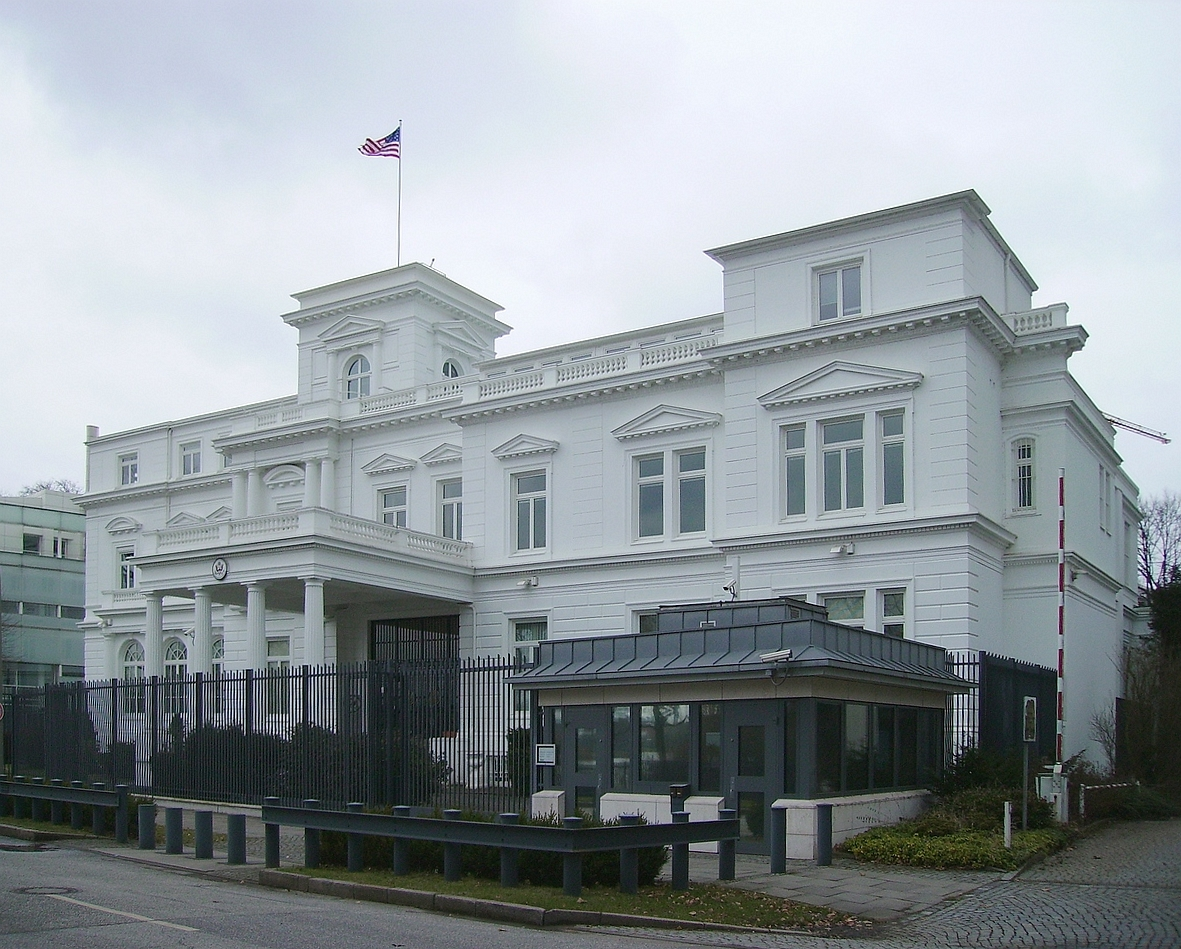
Consulate-General of the United States in Hamburg

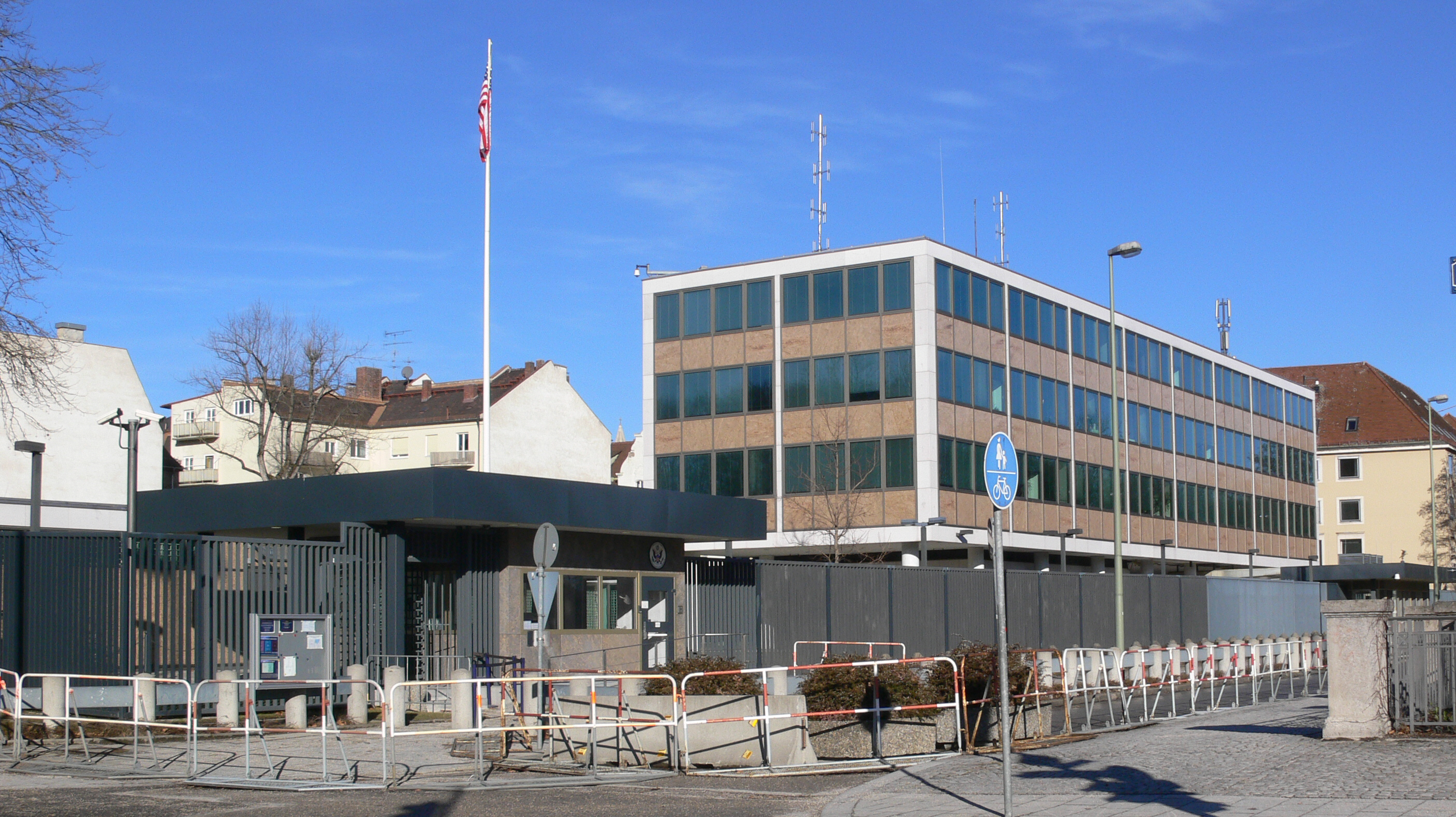
Consulate-General of the United States in Munich

== See also ==
- Foreign relations of Germany
- Foreign relations of the United States
- Embassy of Germany, Washington, D.C.
- Embassy of the United States, Berlin
- Ambassadors of Germany to the United States
- Ambassadors of the United States to Germany
- EU–US relations
- EU–NATO relations
- Americans in Germany
- German Americans
- National German-American Alliance
- German interest in the Caribbean
- German language in the United States
- German Parliamentary Committee investigation of the NSA spying scandal

=== Notable organizations ===
- American Academy in Berlin
- Atlantik-Brücke
- German Marshall Fund

=== U.S. relations with former German states ===
- East Germany–United States relations
- United States–West Germany relations
- Prussia–United States relations
- Grand Duchy of Baden–United States relations
- Kingdom of Bavaria–United States relations
- Duchy of Brunswick-Lüneburg–United States relations
- Kingdom of Hanover–United States relations
- German Empire–United States relations
- Hanseatic Republics–United States relations
- Grand Duchy of Hesse–United States relations
- Grand Duchy of Mecklenburg-Schwerin–United States relations
- Grand Duchy of Mecklenburg-Strelitz–United States relations
- Duchy of Nassau–United States relations
- North German Confederation–United States relations
- Grand Duchy of Oldenburg–United States relations
- Principality of Schaumburg-Lippe–United States relations
- Kingdom of Württemberg–United States relations

== Bibliography ==
- Adam, Thomas, ed. Germany and the Americas: Culture, Politics, and History (3 vol ABC-CLIO, 2005), 1300pp of articles by experts excerpt
- Barclay, David E., and Elisabeth Glaser-Schmidt, eds. Transatlantic Images and Perceptions: Germany and America since 1776 (Cambridge UP, 1997) excerpt.
- Bailey, Thomas A. A Diplomatic History of the American People (10th edition 1980) online free to borrow.
- Gatzke, Hans W. Germany and the United States: A "Special Relationship?" (Harvard UP, 1980); popular history of diplomatic relations.
- Herring, George. From colony to superpower: U.S. foreign relations since 1776 (2011)
- Jonas, Manfred. The United States and Germany: a diplomatic history (Cornell UP, 1985), a standard scholarly survey. excerpt
- Meyer, Heinz-Dieter. The design of the university: German, American, and "world class". (Routledge, 2016).
- Trefousse, Hans Louis, ed. Germany and America: essays on problems of international relations and immigration (Brooklyn College Press, 1980), essays by scholars.
- Trommler, Frank and Joseph McVeigh, eds. America and the Germans: An Assessment of a Three-Hundred-Year History (2 vol. U of Pennsylvania Press, 1990)
- Trommler, Frank, and Elliott Shore, eds. The German-American Encounter: conflict and cooperation between two cultures, 1800–2000 (2001), essays by cultural scholars.

=== Before 1933 ===
- Adam, Thomas and Ruth Gross, ed. Traveling Between Worlds: German-American Encounters (Texas A&M UP, 2006), primary sources.
- Adams, Henry Mason. Prussian-American Relations: 1775–1871 (1960).
- Beale. Howard K. Theodore Roosevelt and the rise of America to world power (1956) pp 335–447. online
- Bönker, Dirk (2012). Militarism in a Global Age: Naval Ambitions in Germany and the United States before World War I. Cornell U.P. ISBN 978-0801464355.
- Bonner, Thomas N. "German Doctors in America—1887-1914: Their Views and Impressions of American Life and Medicine." Journal of the history of medicine and allied sciences (1959): 1–17. online
- Brown Jr, Marvin L. "American Independence Through Prussian Eyes: A Neutral View of the Negotiations of 1782‐1783." The Historian 18.2 (1956): 189–201.
- Brown Jr, Marvin L. ed. American Independence Through Prussian Eyes: A Neutral View of the Negotiations of 1782‐1783 (Duke University Press, I959), primary sources.
- Delaney, Paul L. "A comparative study of the causes underlying the recognition of the United States by France and Prussia". (Thesis, Georgetown Law School, 1937) online; reprints and analyses primary sources from 1780s.
- Diehl, Carl. "Innocents abroad: American students in German universities, 1810–1870." History of Education Quarterly 16#3 (1976): 321–341. in JSTOR
- Dippel, Horst. Germany and the American Revolution, 1770–1800 (1977), Showed a deep intellectual impact on Germany of the American Revolution.
- Doerries, Reinhard R. "Imperial Berlin and Washington: New Light on Germany's Foreign Policy and America's Entry into World War I." Central European History 11.1 (1978): 23–49. online.
- Doerries, Reinhard R. Imperial Challenge: Ambassador Count Bernstorff and German-American Relations, 1908–1917 (1989).
- Faust, Albert Bernhardt. The German Element in the United States with Special Reference to Its Political, Moral, Social, and Educational Influence. 2 vol (1909). vol. 1, vol. 2
- Flanagan, Jason C. "Woodrow Wilson's 'Rhetorical Restructuring': The Transformation of the American Self and the Construction of the German Enemy." Rhetoric & Public Affairs 7.2 (2004): 115–148.
- Gazley, John Gerow. American Opinion of German Unification, 1848–1871 (1926). online
- Gienow-Hecht, Jessica C. E. "Trumpeting Down the Walls of Jericho: The Politics of Art, Music and Emotion in German-American Relations, 1870–1920," Journal of Social History (2003) 36#3 online
- Haworth, Paul Leland. "Frederick the Great and the American Revolution" American Historical Review (1904) 9#3 pp. 460–478 open access in JSTOR, Frederick hated England but kept Prussia neutral.
- Herwig, Holger H. Politics of frustration: the United States in German naval planning, 1889–1941 (1976).
- Holthaus, Leonie. "The liberal internationalist self and the construction of an undemocratic German other at the beginning of the twentieth century." in Prussians, Nazis and Peaceniks (Manchester UP, 2020).
- Jones, Kenneth Paul, ed. U.S. Diplomats in Europe, 1919–41 (ABC-CLIO. 1981) scholarly essays coiver the Ruhr crisis, Dawes Plan, Young Plan, and Nazi Germany. online
- Junker, Detlef. The Manichaean Trap: American Perceptions of the German Empire, 1871–1945 (German Historical Institute, 1995).
- Keim, Jeannette. Forty years of German-American political relations (1919) online, Comprehensive analysis of major issues, including tariff, China, Monroe Doctrine.
- Kennedy, Paul. Samoan Tangle: A Study in Anglo-German-American Relations 1878–1900 (1974).
- Kennedy, Paul. The Rise of the Anglo-German Antagonism: 1860–1914 (1980)
- Leab, Daniel J. "Screen Images of the 'Other' in Wilhelmine Germany and the United States, 1890–1918." Film History 9#1 (1997): 49–70. in JSTOR
- Lingelbach, William E. "Saxon-American Relations, 1778–1828." American Historical Review 17#3 (1912): 517–539. online
- Link, Arthur S. Wilson: The Struggle for Neutrality, 1914–1915 (1960). vol 3 of his biography of Woodrow Wilson; vol 4 and 5 cover 1915–1917.
- Marin, Séverine Antigone. "Personalized Competition: Theodore Roosevelt and Kaiser Wilhelm in German-American Relations." in Hans Krabbendam and John Thompson eds. America’s Transatlantic Turn (Palgrave Macmillan, New York, 2012) pp. 121–140.
- Maurer, John H. "American naval concentration and the German battle fleet, 1900–1918." Journal of Strategic Studies 6#2 (1983): 147–181.
- Mitchell, Nancy. The danger of dreams: German and American imperialism in Latin America (1999).
- Mustafa, Sam A. Merchants and Migrations: Germans and Americans in Connection, 1776–1835 (2001).
- Oehling, Richard A. "Germans in Hollywood Films: The Changing Image, 1914-1939." Film & History 3.2 (1973): 1-26.
- Oren, Ido. "The subjectivity of the 'democratic' peace: changing US perceptions of imperial Germany." International Security 20.2 (1995): 147–184. online
- Parsons, James Russell. Prussian schools through American eyes; a report to the New York state Department of public instruction (1891) online
- Pochmann, Henry A. German Culture in America: Philosophical and Literary Influences 1600–1900 (1957). 890pp; comprehensive review of German influence on Americans esp 19th century. online
- Reeves, Jesse S. "The Prussian-American Treaties" American Journal of International Law (1917) vol. 11 online
- Röhrs, Hermann. The Classical German Concept of the University and Its Influence on Higher Education in the United States (Frankfurt am Main: Peter Lang, 1995).
- Schoonover, Thomas. Germany in Central America: Competitive Imperialism, 1821–1929(1998) online
- Schröder, Hans-Jürgen, ed. Confrontation and cooperation: Germany and the United States in the era of World War I, 1900–1924 (1993).
- Schwabe, Klaus "Anti-Americanism within the German Right, 1917–1933," Amerikastudien/American Studies (1976) 21#1 pp 89–108.
- Schwabe, Klaus. Woodrow Wilson, Revolutionary Germany, and Peacemaking, 1918–1919, University of North Carolina Press, 1985.
- Shippee, Lester Burrell. "German-American Relations, 1890-1914." Journal of Modern History 8.4 (1936): 479–488. online, focus on trade wars.
- Sides, Ashley. What Americans Said about Saxony, and what this Says about Them: Interpreting Travel Writings of the Ticknors and Other Privileged Americans, 1800—1850 (MA Thesis, University of Texas at Arlington, 2008). online
- Singer, Sandra L. Adventures abroad : North American women at German-speaking universities, 1868-1915 (2003) online
- Small, Melvin. "The United States and the German 'Threat' to the Hemisphere, 1905–1914." The Americas 28#3 (1972): 252–270. Says there was no threat because Germany accepted the Monroe Doctrine.
- Trommler, Frank. "The Lusitania Effect: America's Mobilization against Germany in World War I." German Studies Review (2009): 241–266. online
- Vagts, Alfred. Deutschland und die Vereinigten Staaten in der Weltpolitik (2 vols.) (New York: Dornan, 1935), a major study of 2000 pages that was never translated.
  - Vagts, Alfred. "Hopes and Fears of an American-German War, 1870–1915 I." Political Science Quarterly 54#4 (1939): 514–535. in JSTOR
  - Vagts, Alfred. "Hopes and Fears of an American-German War, 1870–1915 II." Political Science Quarterly 55#1 (1940): 53–76. in JSTOR
- Wittke, Carl. Refugees of Revolution: The German Forty-Eighters in America (1952). at archive.org
- Wittke, Carl. "American Germans in Two World Wars." Wisconsin Magazine of History (1943): 6–16. online
- Zacharasiewicz, Waldemar. Images of Germany in American literature (2007).

=== 1933–1941 ===
- Bell, Leland V. "The Failure of Nazism in America: The German American Bund, 1936–1941." Political Science Quarterly 85#4 (1970): 585–599. in JSTOR
- Dallek Robert. Roosevelt and American Foreign Policy (Oxford University Press, 1979)
- Fischer, Klaus P. Hitler & America (2011)
- Freidel, Frank. "FDR vs. Hitler: American Foreign Policy, 1933-1941" Proceedings of the Massachusetts Historical Society. Vol. 99 (1987), pp. 25–43 online.
- Frye, Alton. Nazi Germany and the American Hemisphere, 1933–1941 (1967).
- Haag, John. "Gone With the Wind in Nazi Germany." Georgia Historical Quarterly 73#2 (1989): 278–304. in JSTOR
- Heilbut, Anthony. Exiled in Paradise: German Refugee Artists and Intellectuals in America from the 1930s to the Present (1983).
- Margolick, David. Beyond Glory: Joe Louis vs. Max Schmeling and a World on the Brink. (2005), world heavyweight boxing championship.
- Moore, Michaela Hönicke. Know your enemy : the American debate on Nazism, 1933-1945 (2010) online
  - Honicke, Michaela. "Know your enemy": American interpretations of National Socialism, 1933–1945" (PhD dissertation, University of North Carolina at Chapel Hill; ProQuest Dissertations Publishing, 1998. 9914850); uses US government documents, Hollywood movies, newsreels, magazine articles, radio shows and public opinion polls. I
- Nagorski, Andrew. Hitlerland: American Eyewitnesses to the Nazi Rise to Power (2012).
- Norden, Margaret K. "American Editorial Response to the Rise of Adolf Hitler: A Preliminary Consideration." American Jewish Historical Quarterly 59#3 (1970): 290–301. in JSTOR
- Offner, Arnold A. American Appeasement: United States Foreign Policy and Germany, 1933–1938 (Harvard University Press, 1969)
- Pederson, William D. ed. A Companion to Franklin D. Roosevelt (2011)
- Rosenbaum, Robert A. Waking to Danger: Americans and Nazi Germany, 1933–1941 (2010)
- Sandeen, Eric J. "Anti-Nazi sentiment in film: Confessions of a Nazi spy and the German-American Bund." American Studies (1979): 69–81, on Hollywood online.
- Schuler, Friedrich E. Mexico between Hitler and Roosevelt: Mexican foreign relations in the age of Lázaro Cárdenas, 1934–1940 (1999).
- Weinberg, Gerhard L. The Foreign Policy of Hitler's Germany (1980)
- Weinberg, Gerhard L. "Hitler's image of the United States." American Historical Review 69#4 (1964): 1006–1021. in JSTOR

=== After 1941 ===
- Backer, John H. The Decision to Divide Germany: American Foreign Policy in Transition (1978)
- Bark, Dennis L. and David R. Gress. A History of West Germany Vol 1: From Shadow to Substance, 1945–1963 (1989); A History of West Germany Vol 2: Democracy and Its Discontents 1963–1988 (1989), the standard scholarly history in English
- Blumenau, Bernhard, 'German Foreign Policy and the 'German Problem' During and After the Cold War: Changes and Continuities'. in: B Blumenau, J Hanhimäki & B Zanchetta (eds), New Perspectives on the End of the Cold War: Unexpected Transformations? Ch. 5. London: Routledge, 2018. ISBN 9781138731349 .
- Brady, Steven J. Eisenhower and Adenauer: Alliance Maintenance Under pressure, 1953–1960 (Rowman & Littlefield, 2009). online review
- Casey, Stephen, Cautious Crusade: Franklin D. Roosevelt, American Public Opinion, and the War against Nazi Germany (2004)
- Clark, Claudia. Dear Barack: The Extraordinary Partnership of Barack Obama and Angela Merkel (2021)
- Colbourn, Susan (2022). Euromissiles: The Nuclear Weapons That Nearly Destroyed NATO. Ithaca, New York: Cornell University Press. ISBN 978-1501766022.
- Costigliola, Frank. "An 'Arm around the Shoulder': The United States, NATO and German Reunification, 1989-90." Contemporary European History (1994) pp: 87–110. online
- Costigliola, Frank. "Lyndon B. Johnson, Germany, and ‘The End of the Cold War.’." in Lyndon Johnson Confronts the World: American Foreign Policy, 1963–1968 (1963) pp: 173-210.
- Fink, Leon. "The Good Postwar: German Worker Rights, 1945–1950" in Fink, Undoing the Liberal World Order: Progressive Ideals and Political Realities Since World War II (Columbia UP, 2022) online 46–74.
- Gimbel John F. American Occupation of Germany (Stanford UP, 1968)
- Granieri, Ronald J. The Ambivalent Alliance: Konrad Adenauer, the CDU/CSU, and the West, 1949-1966 (Berghahn Books, 2003).
- Hanrieder Wolfram. West German Foreign Policy, 1949–1979 (Westview, 1980)
- Höhn, Maria H. GIs and Frèauleins: The German-American Encounter in 1950s West Germany (U of North Carolina Press, 2002)
- Immerfall, Stefan. Safeguarding German-American Relations in the New Century: Understanding and Accepting Mutual Differences (2006)
- Ingimundarson, Valur. "The Eisenhower Administration, the Adenauer Government, and the Political Uses of the East German Uprising in 1953." Diplomatic History 20.3 (1996): 381–410. online
- Ingimundarson, Valur. "Containing the Offensive: The 'Chief of the Cold War' and the Eisenhower Administration's German Policy." Presidential Studies Quarterly 27.3 (1997): 480–495. online
- Junker, Detlef, et al. eds. The United States and Germany in the Era of the Cold War, 1945–1968: A Handbook, Vol. 1: 1945–1968; (2004) excerpt and text search; Vol. 2: 1968–1990 (2004) excerpt and text search, comprehensive coverage.
- Kefferpütz, Roderick and Jeremy Stern. "The United States, Germany, and World Order: New Priorities for a Changing Alliance." Atlantic Council: Issue Brief (2021) online
- Kuklick, Bruce. American Policy and the Division of Germany: The Clash with Russia over Reparations (Cornell University Press, 1972)
- Langenbacher, Eric, and Ruth Wittlinger. "The End of Memory? German-American Relations under Donald Trump." German Politics 27.2 (2018): 174–192. online
- Large, David Clay. Germans to the Front: West German Rearmament in the Adenauer Era (U of North Carolina Press, 1996).
- Ninkovich, Frank. Germany and the United States: The Transformation of the German Question since 1945 (1988)
- Nolan, Mary. "Anti-Americanism and Americanization in Germany." Politics & Society (2005) 33#1 pp 88–122.
- Pells, Richard. Not like Us: How Europeans Have Loved, Hated and Transformed American Culture since World War II (1997) online
- Pettersson, Lucas. "Changing images of the USA in German media discourse during four American presidencies." International Journal of Cultural Studies (2011) 14#1 pp 35–51.
- Poiger, Uta G. Jazz, Rock, and Rebels Cold War Politics and American Culture in a Divided Germany (2000)
- Pommerin, Reiner. The American Impact on Postwar Germany (Berghahn Books, 1995) * Smith, Gaddis. American Diplomacy During the Second World War, 1941-1945 (1965) online
- Smith Jean E. Lucius D. Clay (1990), scholarly biography excerpt
- Smyser, William R. Restive Partners: Washington and Bonn Diverge (Routledge, 2019). excerpt
- Spohr, Kristina. "Precluded or precedent-setting? The 'NATO enlargement question' in the triangular Bonn-Washington-Moscow diplomacy of 1990–1991." Journal of Cold War Studies 14.4 (2012): 4-54. online
- Stephan, Alexander, ed. Americanization and Anti-Americanism: The German Encounter With American Culture After 1945 (Berghahn Books, 2013).
- Szabo, Stephen F. "Different Approaches to Russia: The German–American–Russian Strategic Triangle." German Politics 27.2 (2018): 230–243, regarding the Cold War

=== Historiography and memory ===
- Adams, Willi Paul. "American History Abroad: Personal Reflections on the Conditions of Scholarship in West Germany." Reviews in American History 14.4 (1986): 557–568. online
- Depkat, Volker. "Introduction: American History/ies in Germany: Assessments, Transformations, Perspectives." Amerikastudien/American Studies (2009): 337–343. in JSTOR
- Doerries, Reinhard R. "The Unknown Republic: American History at German Universities." Amerikastudien/American Studies (2005): 99–125. in JSTOR
- Fiebig-von Hase, Ragnhild, and Ursula Lehmkuhl, eds. Enemy images in American history (Berghahn Books, 1998).
- Gassert, Philipp. "Writing about the (American) past, thinking of the (German) present: The history of US foreign relations in Germany." Amerikastudien/American Studies (2009): 345–382. in JSTOR
- Gassert, Philipp. "The Study of U.S. History in Germany." European Contributions to American Studies (2007), Vol. 66, pp 117–132.
- Schröder, Hans-Jürgen. "Twentieth-Century German-American Relations: Historiography and Research Perspectives" in Frank Trommler, Joseph McVeigh eds., America and the Germans, Volume 2: An Assessment of a Three-Hundred Year History--The Relationship in the Twentieth Century (1985) online
- Sielke, Sabine. "Theorizing American Studies: German Interventions into an Ongoing Debate." European journal of American studies 1.1-1 (2006) online
- Stelzel, Philipp. "Working toward a common goal? American views on German historiography and German-American scholarly relations during the 1960s." Central European History 41.4 (2008): 639–671. online
- Strunz, Gisela. American Studies oder Amerikanistik?: Die deutsche Amerikawissenchaft und die Hoffnung auf Erneuerung der Hochschulen und der politischen Kultur nach 1945 (Springer-Verlag, 2013).
- Tuttle, William M. "American higher education and the Nazis: the case of James B. Conant and Harvard University's" diplomatic relations" with Germany." American Studies 20.1 (1979): 49-70. online
- Wilhelm, Cornelia. "Nazi Propaganda and the Uses of the Past: Heinz Kloss and the Making of a" German America"." Amerikastudien/American Studies (2002): 55–83. online
