= Bacatec =

Coordinates: 49.594373°N 11.018692°E

Established in 2000, BaCaTec for Bavaria California Technology Center is a technology platform for research exchange between universities in the federal states of Bavaria in Germany and the state of California in the United States of America.

== Mission ==
The mission of BaCaTeC is to increase and promote cooperations between researchers, including academic and commercial efforts, located in Bavaria and California, by providing a data basis for the identification of potential partners and assists initial contacts. BaCaTeC also sponsors projects with seed money to start up new collaborations amongst the participants.

BaCaTeC strongly encourages the expansion and development of research projects by academic and/or commercial Bavarian and Californian institutions which have the potential to attract external funding in the future.

== Areas of Study ==
Participants in active exchange between the universities are involved in the following areas of study:

- life sciences
- information and communication technologies
- new materials
- environmental technologies and
- mechatronics

== Status ==
As of July 2009, there have been 299 joint research projects, on which BaCatec spent about €1.6 million.
