= Muhamed Mehmedbašić =

Muslim revolutionary and conspirator

- Мухамед Мехмедбашић
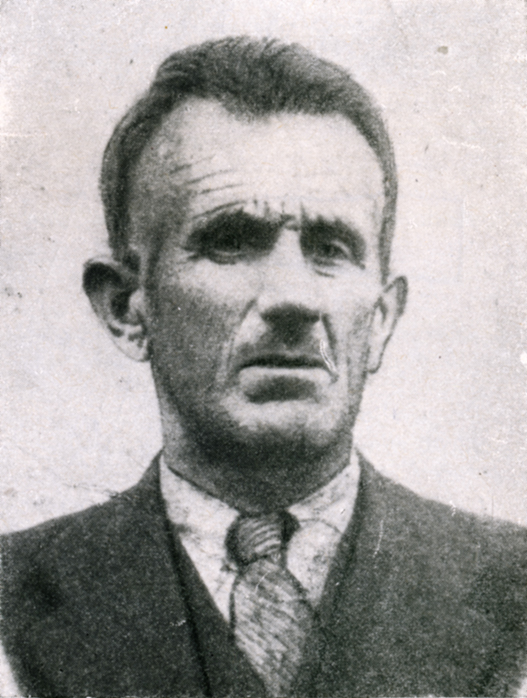
- Mehmedbašić in the interwar period
- Born: 1887; Stolac, Bosnia and Herzegovina, Austria-Hungary
- Died: 29 May 1943 (aged 55–56); Sarajevo, Independent State of Croatia
- Cause of death: Killed by Ustaše
- Occupation: Carpenter

Muhamed Mehmedbašić (Serbian Cyrillic: Мухамед Мехмедбашић; 1887 – 29 May 1943) was a Muslim carpenter, revolutionary and among the conspirators in the assassination of Archduke Franz Ferdinand, which led to a sequence of events that resulted in the outbreak of World War I.

== Early life ==
Mehmedbašić was born in 1887 into a Muslim family in Stolac, in the region of Herzegovina (at the time part of Austro-Hungarian Bosnia and Herzegovina). His father was impoverished, formerly part of the Ottoman nobility. Mehmedbašić worked as a carpenter. During a Muslim youth organization's trip to Belgrade, Mehmedbašić befriended Mustafa Golubić (another Muslim, also from Stolac) who influenced his revolutionary feelings. Mehmedbašić, as did Mustafa Golubić, identified as Serb Muslim.

While working as a carpenter, Mehmedbašić befriended Black Hand member Danilo Ilić, the main organizer of conspiracy against the Austro-Hungarian rule in Bosnia and Herzegovina. He joined the Young Bosnia revolutionary organization and became a colleague of its ideologue Vladimir Gaćinović, who was also a member of the Black Hand. As Mehmedbašić held strong Serbian nationalist sentiment, and Ilić and Gaćinović saw a strong character in him, he was given delicate duties. He was sworn into the Black Hand by Provincial Director for Bosnia-Herzegovina Vladimir Gaćinović and Danilo Ilić. In 1912–13, Serbia fought in the Balkan Wars. Black Hand founding member Vojislav Tankosić led a Chetnik detachment, in which many revolutionaries volunteered (including Golubić).

== Young Bosnia ==
=== Potiorek assassination plot ===
In late 1913, Danilo Ilić recommended the end of revolutionary organization building and a move to direct action against Austria-Hungary when meeting a Serbian captain and fellow Black Hand member in Užice. Ilić then met with Chief of Serbian Military Intelligence Colonel Dragutin Dimitrijević "Apis", the leader of the Black Hand, to discuss the matter. Apis' right hand, Serbian Major Vojislav Tankosić, called an action planning meeting in Toulouse, France. On Orthodox New Year, Golubić called Mehmedbašić, who was in Stolac, to immediately come to the meeting in Toulouse. During this January 1914 meeting, various possible Austro-Hungarian targets for assassination were discussed, including Franz Ferdinand. However, it was decided only to kill the Governor of Bosnia, Oskar Potiorek. The assassination plot was organized in Toulouse by Gaćinović and Golubić. Mehmedbašić was chosen for the task. He had left Stolac with 300 krone borrowed to finance the plot. Mehmedbašić was (according to himself) "eager to carry out the act to revive the revolutionary spirit of Bosnia." He was given a Swedish knife containing poison.

Mehmedbašić arrived at Dubrovnik by steamship, and then traveled by train. At the Hum train station, on the way to Sarajevo, gendarmes searched the train; fearing they were on to him, he threw the knife out the window. Potiorek was planned to be assassinated at the end of March 1914, when the new mufti Čaušević was to be enthroned in Sarajevo. However, upon hearing that Archduke Franz Ferdinand of Austria would come to Sarajevo on Vidovdan, the Black Hand changed their minds. The Archduke's scheduled visit on Vidovdan (28 June), a Serbian national holiday, was perceived as an insult. Ilić summoned Mehmedbašić and informed him on 26 March that the plan now was to murder Archduke Franz Ferdinand, as ordered by Apis, and Mehmedbašić should stand by for the new operation. Mehmedbašić said during talks of the assassination that "half of Bosnia and Herzegovina will join the plot, and the other half will approve everything we do".

=== Assassination of Archduke Franz Ferdinand ===
Apis and fellow conspirators Milan Ciganović and Major Tankosić hired three youngsters, Gavrilo Princip, Nedeljko Čabrinović and Trifko Grabež to carry out the assassination. Gavrilo Princip stayed in Sarajevo with Danilo Ilić, who hired three more as a backup team, Vaso Čubrilović, Cvjetko Popović and Mehmedbašić. On 28 June, a Sunday, a motorcade took the royal party to the City Hall for the official reception. Security was light; the Archduke objected to heavy security and soldiers between him and the people. 120 police officers were on crowd duty. The group of six assassins were positioned along the route, the Appel Quay. The first opportunity came to Mehmedbašić, who stood by the Austro-Hungarian Bank, but he lost his nerve (later claiming that a policeman stood near and would have intervened if he took his grenade) and watched the motorcade pass. Likewise, the second, Čubrilović, did not act. The next, Čabrinović, threw his bomb which bounced off the royal car and exploded under the following car, wounding two in the car and twenty in the crowd, then survived a suicide attempt as his cyanide did not work, and was arrested. Princip, hearing the explosion, believed the assassination to be a success and went to a nearby café. The motorcade made it safely to the Hall, and speeches were held, in which Franz Ferdinand was concerned about the injured and insisted on visiting them at the hospital, advised against by von Morsey but supported by Potiorek. As the motorcade took a wrong route to the hospital, it found itself outside the café where Princip was at; he fired fatal shots at the royal couple and then turned the gun at himself, however, two bystanders stopped him and he was arrested.

Čabrinović and Princip gave up the names of their fellow conspirators under torture. Mehmedbašić managed to escape (wearing civilian clothes and a fez) to Montenegro, arriving on 4 July, but Danilo Ilić, Veljko Čubrilović, Vaso Čubrilović, Cvjetko Popović and Miško Jovanović were arrested and charged with treason and murder. Upon learning that Mehmedbašić was in Nikšić, the Austro-Hungarian authorities urged the Montenegrin authorities to have him arrested and handed over to them. Jovan Plamenac said that the Montenegrin government gave strict orders to capture Mehmedbašić, but informed the Austro-Hungarian diplomacy that the Montenegrin government had no intention to hand him over if they captured him, and that instead, a Montenegrin court would judge him. On 12 July, Mehmedbašić was apprehended by the Montenegrin authorities. However, before he could be extradited, he escaped from the Nikšić prison two days later. It has been claimed that the Montenegrin government hid him and had him sent over the Čakor mountain into Serbia. The Austro-Hungarian authorities suspected Montenegrin collusion in his escape and arrested the gendarmes who guarded Mehmedbašić. During his captivity, Mehmedbašić admitted his complicity in the assassination.

== World War I ==
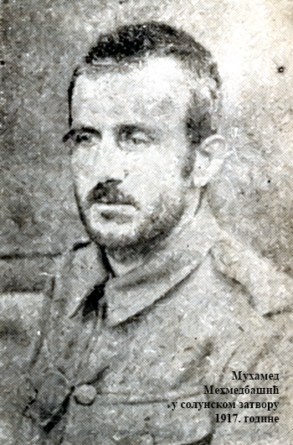
Muhamed Mehmedbašić while imprisoned in Thessaloniki during the Serbian court-martial in 1917.

In Serbia, Mehmedbašić met up with Mustafa Golubić, with whom he joined the Chetnik detachment of Vojislav Tankosić that fought in World War I. He trained Bosnian volunteers. Mehmedbašić met with Apis on several occasions.

Mehmedbašić was accused of having participated in an alleged plot to kill Serbian regent Alexander in 1916. For some time, Regent Alexander and officers loyal to him had planned to get rid of the military clique headed by Apis who represented a political threat to Alexander's power. The Austro-Hungarian peace demand gave added impetus to this plan. On 15 March 1917 Apis and the officers loyal to him were indicted, on various false charges by Serbian Court Martial on the French-controlled Salonika front (known in Serbo-Croatian as Solunski proces). On 23 May, Apis and eight of his associates were sentenced to death; two others (one was Mehmedbašić) were sentenced to 15 years in prison. Charges were eventually reduced, leaving three death sentences in place. Among those tried, Apis, Ljubomir Vulović, Rade Malobabić and Mehmedbašić confessed their roles in Sarajevo. During the trial, Mehmedbašić said that "I saw in Serbia with my eyes as the Piedmont of Serbdom, I couldn't see anything else..." and that his idol was "the national guslar (poet) singing Serbian songs". It was later found that Mehmedbašić had in fact proved the trial false. Serbia's Supreme Court retried the case and all defendants were exonerated (rehabilitated) in 1953.

== Interwar period and death ==
He survived the war and called the arrival of the Serbian army in Bosnia and Herzegovina the "happiest day in his life". Mehmedbašić's sentence was commuted and he was released in 1919. He was pardoned by King Alexander himself, who reportedly gave him a house in Ilidža.

The fascist and pro-Nazi Ustaše promoted anti-Princip propaganda as part of their anti-Serb agenda. They regularly accused former Young Bosnian assassination conspirators of being allied with communists. Ustaše physically persecuted Mehmedbašić and his wife. Mehmedbašić was killed during World War II in Yugoslavia, likely as part of the Ustaše's campaign of genocide against Serbs, having been executed by the Ustaše on 29 May 1943. He was buried in the cemetery of the town of Sarajevo, in the Ilidza municipality, located on a side of the present-day Sarajevo Airport, in the outskirts of the city.

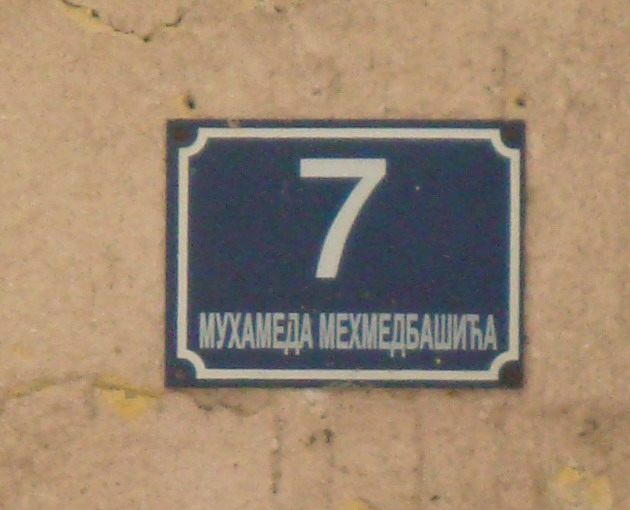
Muhamed Mehmedbašić Street in Banja Luka.

== Sources ==
- Albertini, Luigi (1953). Origins of the War of 1914. Vol. II. Oxford: Oxford University Press. OCLC 168712.
- Apis, Dragutin T. Dimitrijević (1918). Tajna prevratna organizacija. Velika Srbija.
- Beatović, Đorđe; Milanović, Dragoljub (1989). Veleizdaǰnički procesi Srbima u Austro-Ugarskoj. Književne novine. ISBN 9788639101589.
- Blakley, Patrick R. F. (2009). "Narodna Odbrana (The Black Hand): Terrorist Faction that Divided the World" (PDF). Oswego Historical Review. 2: 13–34.
- Ciardha, Éamonn Ó; Vojvoda, Gabriela (2015). Politics of Identity in Post-Conflict States: The Bosnian and Irish experience. Taylor & Francis. ISBN 9781317483557.
- Dedijer, Vladimir (1966). The Road to Sarajevo. New York: Simon and Schuster. OCLC 400010.
- Donnelley, Paul (2012). Assassination!. Dataday. pp. 33–35. ISBN 978-1-908963-03-1.
- Donia, Robert J. (2006). Sarajevo: A Biography. University of Michigan Press. ISBN 9780472115570.
- Glenny, Misha (2012). The Balkans: Nationalism, War, and the Great Powers, 1804-2012: New and Updated. House of Anansi Press Incorporated. ISBN 978-1-77089-274-3.
- Hoare, Marko Attila (2007). The History of Bosnia: From the Middle Ages to the Present Day. Saqi. ISBN 9780863569531.
- Kantowicz, Edward R. (1999). The Rage of Nations. Wm. B. Eerdmans Publishing. pp. 97–98. ISBN 978-0-8028-4455-2.
- Konjhodžić, Alija S. (1974). Spomenica Bratstva: 1954-1974. Toronto: Basilian Press. pp. 381–382.
- Kruševac, Todor (1960). Сарајево под аустро-угарском управом, 1878-1918: 1878-1918. Изд. Музеја града Сарајева.
- Ljubibratić, Dragoslav (1959). Gavrilo Princip. Nolit.
- MacKenzie, David (1995). Black Hand on Trial: Salonika 1917. Eastern European Monographs. ISBN 978-0-88033-320-7.
- Miller, Paul (2014). "Yugoslav Eulogies: The Footprints of Gavrilo Princip". The Carl Beck Papers. doi:10.5195/cbp.2014.194.
- Nešković, Borivoje (1953). Istina o solunskom procesu. Narodna knjiga.
- Rakočević, Novica (1997). Crna Gora u prvom svjetskom ratu, 1914-1918. Unireks. ISBN 9788642705835.
- Slijepčević, Pero (1929). Napor Bosne i Hercegovine za oslobođenje i ujedinjenje. Izd. Obl. odbora nar. odbrane. pp. 209, 214, 217.
- Treadway, John D. (1983). The Falcon and the Eagle: Montenegro and Austria-Hungary, 1908-1914. Purdue University Press. ISBN 1-55753-146-3.
- Živanović, Milan Ž. (1955). Солунски процес хиљаду деветсто седамнаесте: прилог за проучавање политичке историје Србије од 1903 до 1918 год. Српска академија наука.
