= Assassination of Archduke Franz Ferdinand =

1914 shooting in Sarajevo

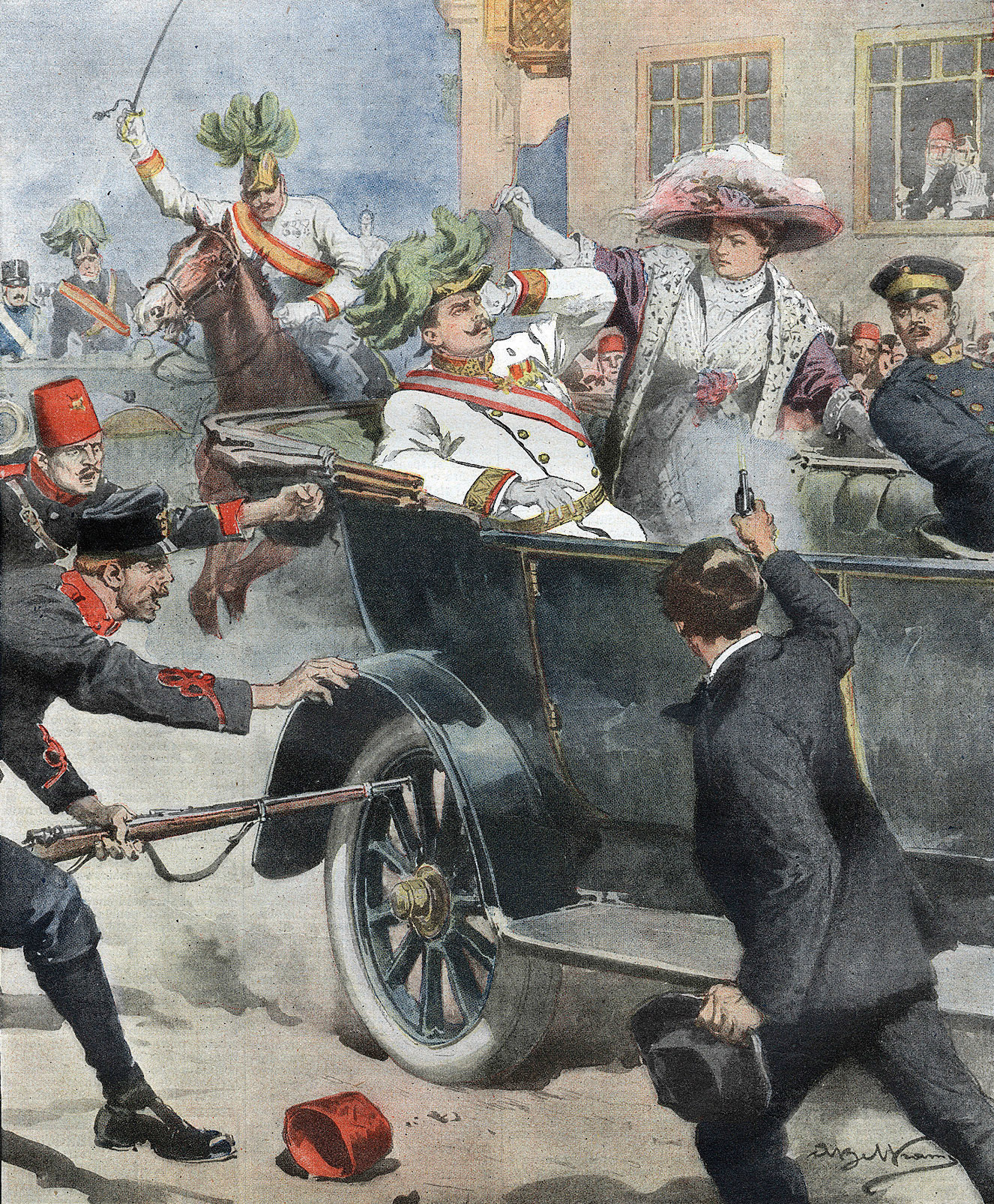
- Assassination illustrated in the Italian newspaper La Domenica del Corriere, 12 July 1914 by Achille Beltrame
- Date: 28 June 1914; 112 years ago
- Location: Near the Latin Bridge, Sarajevo, in the Condominium of Bosnia and Herzegovina, Austria-Hungary; 43°51′29″N 18°25′44″E
- Participants: Gavrilo Princip; Nedeljko Čabrinović; Vaso Čubrilović; Cvjetko Popović; Trifko Grabež; Muhamed Mehmedbašić
- Outcome: Prelude to World War I
- Deaths: 2 (Archduke Franz Ferdinand and his wife, Sophie, Duchess of Hohenberg)
- Injuries: 16–20 (in bombing preceding shooting)
- Accused: Multiple conspirators
- Convicted: Gavrilo Princip and others
- Charges: High treason, assassination
- Sentence: 20 years (for Princip)
- Footage: Britannica
- Weapon: FN Model 1910 semi-automatic handgun
Map of the assassination site

Archduke Franz Ferdinand of Austria, heir presumptive to the Austro-Hungarian throne, and his wife, Sophie, Duchess of Hohenberg, were assassinated by Bosnian Serb student Gavrilo Princip in Sarajevo on 28 June 1914. They were shot at close range while being driven through the provincial capital of Bosnia and Herzegovina, formally annexed by Austria-Hungary in 1908. The incident was one of the key events that led to World War I.

Princip was part of a group of six Bosnian assassins together with Muhamed Mehmedbašić, Vaso Čubrilović, Nedeljko Čabrinović, Cvjetko Popović and Trifko Grabež coordinated by Danilo Ilić; all but one were Bosnian Serbs and members of a revolutionary movement later known as Young Bosnia. The political objective of the assassination was to free Bosnia and Herzegovina of Austro-Hungarian rule and establish a common South Slav ("Yugoslav") state. The assassination precipitated the July Crisis, which led to Austria-Hungary declaring war on Serbia and the start of World War I.

The assassination team was helped by the Black Hand, a Serbian secret nationalist group; support came from Dragutin Dimitrijević, chief of the military intelligence section of the Serbian general staff, as well as from Major Vojislav Tankosić and Rade Malobabić, a Serbian intelligence agent. Tankosić provided bombs and pistols to the assassins and trained them in their use. The assassins were given access to the same clandestine network of safe-houses and agents that Malobabić used for the infiltration of weapons and operatives into Austria-Hungary.

The assassins and key members of the clandestine network were tried in Sarajevo in October 1914. In total twenty-five people were indicted. Five of the six assassins were under 20 years old at the time of the assassination, the exception being Mehmedbašić who was 26 or 27. While the group was dominated by Bosnian Serbs, four were Bosnian Croats, one was a Bosnian Muslim and all of them were Austro-Hungarian citizens; none were from Serbia. Princip was found guilty of murder and high treason, but being too young to be executed, was sentenced to 20 years in jail. The four other attackers also received jail terms. Five of the older prisoners were sentenced to be hanged.

Black Hand members were arrested and tried before a Serbian court in Salonika in 1917 on charges of high treason, which were later widely regarded as fabricated. The Black Hand was disbanded, and three of its leaders were executed. Much of what is known about the assassinations comes from these two trials and related records. Princip's legacy was re-evaluated following the breakup of Yugoslavia, and public opinion of him in the successor states is largely divided along ethnic lines.

== Background ==
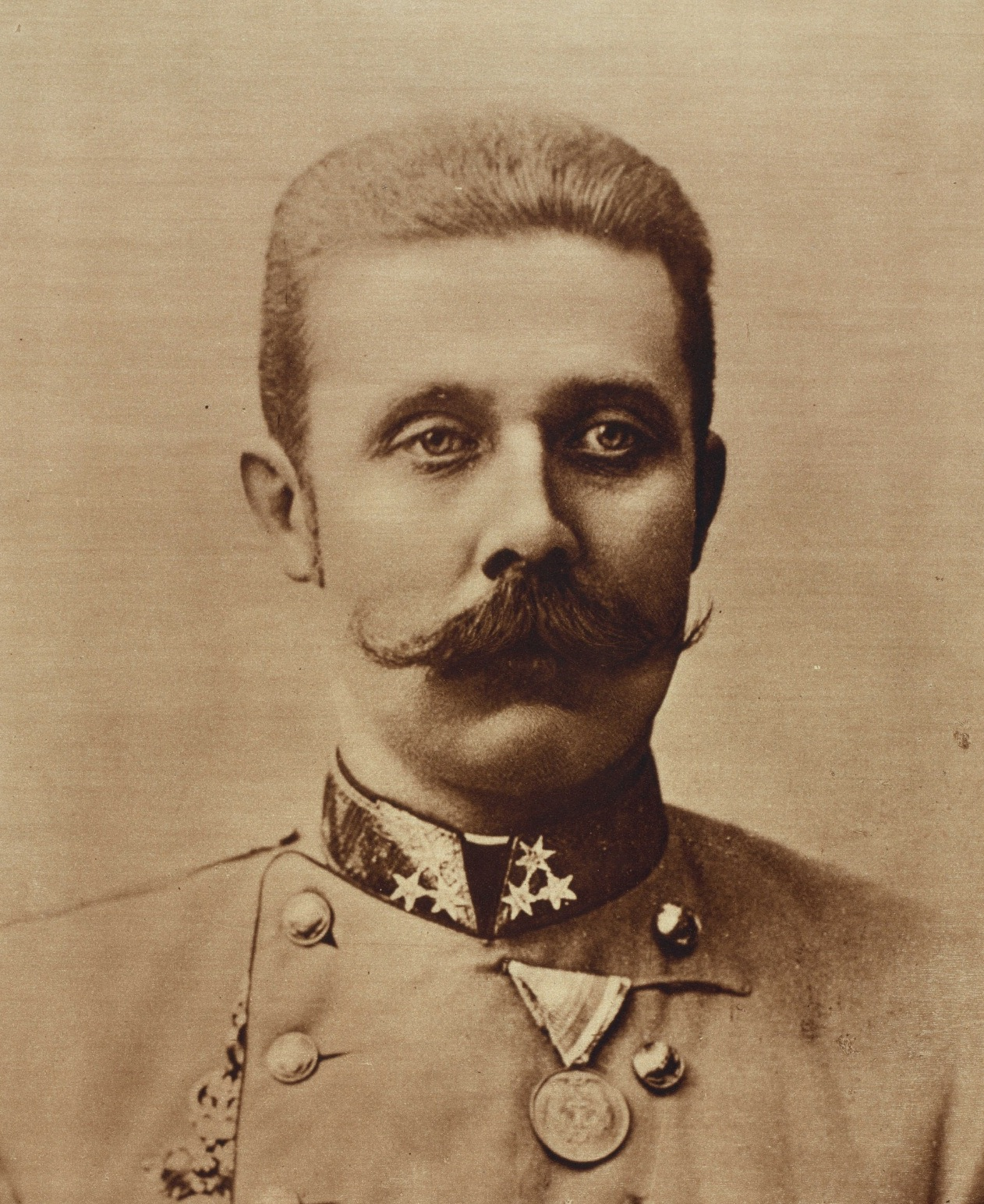
Archduke Franz Ferdinand of Austria

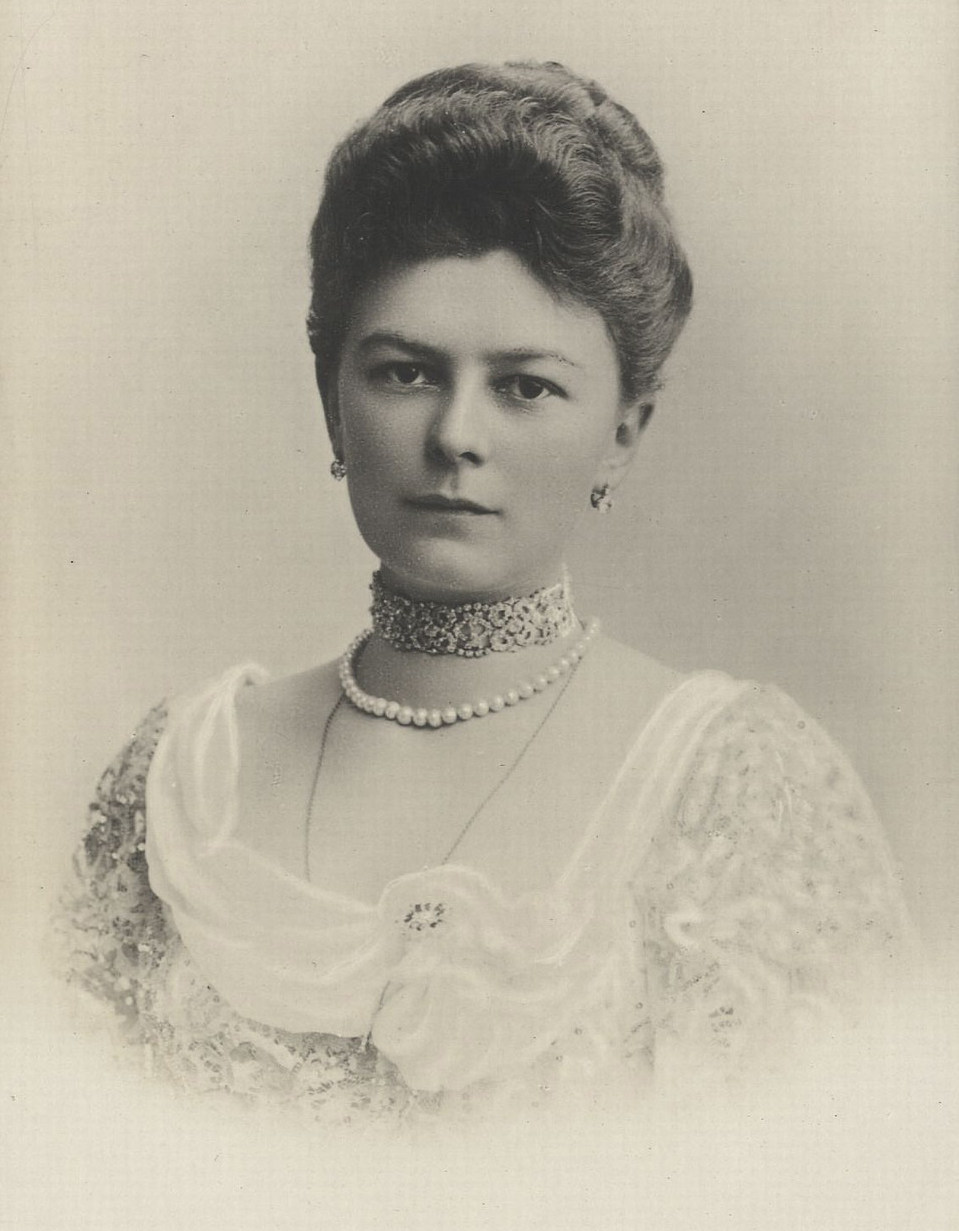
Sophie, Duchess of Hohenberg

Under the 1878 Treaty of Berlin, Austria-Hungary received the mandate to occupy and administer the Ottoman Vilayet of Bosnia, while the Ottoman Empire retained official sovereignty. Under this same treaty, the Great Powers (Austria-Hungary, the United Kingdom, France, the German Empire, Italy, and the Russian Empire) gave official recognition to the Principality of Serbia as a fully sovereign state, which four years later transformed into a kingdom under Prince Milan IV Obrenović who thus became King Milan I of Serbia. Serbia's monarchs, at the time from the royal House of Obrenović that maintained close relations with Austria-Hungary, were content to reign within the borders set by the treaty.

This changed in May 1903, when Royal Serbian Army officers led by Dragutin Dimitrijević stormed the Serbian Royal Palace. After a fierce battle in the dark, the attackers captured General Lazar Petrović, head of the Palace Guard, and forced him to reveal the hiding place of King Alexander I Obrenović and his wife Queen Draga. The King was subsequently shot thirty times and the Queen eighteen. MacKenzie writes that "the royal corpses were then stripped and brutally sabred." The attackers threw the corpses of King Alexander and Queen Draga out of a palace window, ending any threat that loyalists would mount a counterattack. General Petrović was then killed when Vojislav Tankosić organized the murders of Queen Draga's brothers. The conspirators installed Peter I of the House of Karađorđević as the new king.

The new dynasty was more nationalist, friendlier to Russia and less friendly to Austria-Hungary. Over the next decade, disputes between Serbia and its neighbors erupted, as Serbia moved to build its power and gradually reclaim its 14th-century empire. These conflicts included a customs dispute with Austria-Hungary beginning in 1906 (commonly referred to as the "Pig War"); the Bosnian crisis of 1908–1909, in which Serbia assumed an attitude of protest over Austria-Hungary's annexation of Bosnia and Herzegovina (ending in Serbian acquiescence without compensation in March 1909); and finally the two Balkan Wars of 1912–1913, in which Serbia acquired Macedonia and Kosovo from the Ottoman Empire and drove out Bulgaria.

Serbia's military successes and Serbian outrage over the Austro-Hungarian annexation of Bosnia and Herzegovina emboldened Serbian nationalists in Serbia and Serbs in Bosnia who chafed under Austro-Hungarian rule and whose nationalist sentiments were stirred by Serb cultural organizations. One notable example was a Serbian nationalist society Narodna Odbrana, which was formed in Belgrade on 8 October 1908 under the initiative of Milovan Milovanović. Under the guise of cultural activities, it operated to undermine the loyalty of Bosnian Serbs to the Habsburg regime. In the five years leading up to 1914, lone assassins – mostly Serb citizens of Austria-Hungary – made a series of unsuccessful assassination attempts in Croatia-Slavonia and Bosnia and Herzegovina against Austro-Hungarian officials. In Bosnia and Herzegovina existed an aggregation of local revolutionary groups that became known as Young Bosnia, their goal was the end of Austria-Hungarian colonial rule in Bosnia and the unification of all South Slavs.

On 3 June 1910, Bogdan Žerajić, a young revolutionary loosely connected to Young Bosnia, attempted to kill the Austrian governor of Bosnia and Herzegovina, General Marijan Varešanin. Žerajić was a 22-year-old Bosnian Serb from Nevesinje, Herzegovina, who was a student at the Faculty of Law, University of Zagreb. (General Verešanin went on to crush the last Bosnian peasant uprising in the second half of 1910). The five bullets Žerajić fired at Varešanin and the fatal bullet he put in his own brain made Žerajić an inspiration to future assassins, including Princip and his accomplice Čabrinović. Princip said that Žerajić "was my first model. When I was seventeen I passed whole nights at his grave, reflecting on our wretched condition and thinking of him. It is there that I made up my mind sooner or later to perpetrate an outrage."

In May 1911, the Black Hand, a secret society dedicated to creating a Greater Serbia through "terrorist action", was established by key members of the Narodna Odbrana including Dimitrijević and Tankosić. Within Bosnia and Herzegovina, the networks of both the Black Hand and Narodna Odbrana penetrated to some extent local revolutionary movements such as Young Bosnia. The fundamental difference between those movements was that the Young Bosnians regarded social revolution as a necessary corollary of national liberation, and that, even though its membership was predominantly Serb, Young Bosnia also attracted an important minority of Croats and some Muslims. In the Spring of 1912, in a plot involving Young Bosnians, Luka Jukić a Bosnian Croat student, tried to assassinate the Governor of Croatia Count Slavko Cuvaj.

In 1913, Emperor Franz Joseph commanded Archduke Franz Ferdinand to observe the military maneuvers in Bosnia scheduled for June 1914. Following the maneuvers, Ferdinand and his wife planned to visit Sarajevo to open the state museum in its new premises there. Duchess Sophie, according to their eldest son, Duke Maximilian, accompanied her husband out of fear for his safety.

As Sophie, although of high aristocratic birth, was not from a dynastic family, her union with the Habsburg heir presumptive could only be a morganatic marriage. Emperor Franz Joseph had only consented to their marriage on the condition that their descendants would never ascend the throne. The 14th anniversary of their marriage fell on 28 June. As historian A. J. P. Taylor observes:

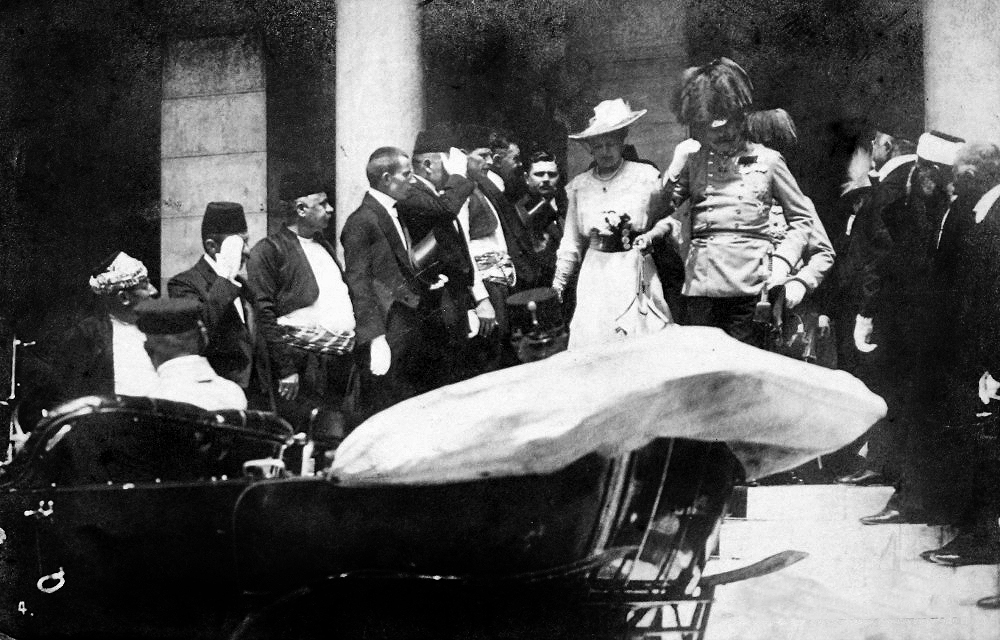
Photograph of the Archduke and his wife emerging from the Sarajevo Town Hall to board their car, a few minutes before the assassination

[Sophie] could never share [Franz Ferdinand's] rank ... could never share his splendours, could never even sit by his side on any public occasion. There was one loophole ... his wife could enjoy the recognition of his rank when he was acting in a military capacity. Hence, he decided, in 1914, to inspect the army in Bosnia. There, at its capital Sarajevo, the Archduke and his wife could ride in an open carriage side by side ... Thus, for love, did the Archduke go to his death.

Franz Ferdinand was an advocate of increased federalism and widely believed to favour trialism, under which Austria-Hungary would be reorganized by combining the Slavic lands within the Austro-Hungarian empire into a third crown. A Slavic kingdom could have been a bulwark against Serb irredentism, and Franz Ferdinand was therefore perceived as a threat by those same irredentists. Princip later stated to the court that preventing Franz Ferdinand's planned reforms was one of his motivations.

The day of the assassination, 28 June (15 June in the Julian calendar), is the feast of St. Vitus. In Serbia, it is called Vidovdan and commemorates the 1389 Battle of Kosovo against the Ottomans, at which Sultan Murad I was assassinated in his tent by a Serb. Princip, Čabrinović and other members of the Young Bosnia were inspired by the heroism of Miloš Obilić, reenacting the Kosovo Myth. Čabrinović was deeply immersed in the myth, personally identifying himself with the Kosovo heroes, while it is known that Princip knew the entire Petar II Petrović-Njegoš's The Mountain Wreath, one of the most celebrated works in the South Slavic literature that glorifies the heroic ideals and spirit of the Kosovo Myth.

== Preliminaries ==
=== Previous conspiracy ===
Danilo Ilić was a Bosnian Serb. He had worked as a schoolteacher and as a bank worker but in 1913 and 1914 he lived with, and outwardly off, his mother, who operated a small boarding house in Sarajevo. Ilić was a member of a secret revolutionary society or Kružok organized on the model of the Black Hand. According to Serbian Colonel C. A. Popović, a captain at the time and a member of the Black Hand, in late 1913, Danilo Ilić came to the Serbian listening post at Užice to speak to him. Popović claimed that Ilić recommended an end to the period of revolutionary organization building and a move to direct action against Austria-Hungary. Popović alleged that he sent Danilo Ilić to Belgrade to discuss this matter with Chief of Serbian Military Intelligence Colonel Dragutin Dimitrijević, known more commonly as Apis. By 1913, Apis and his fellow military conspirators (drawn heavily from the ranks of the May 1903 coup) had come to dominate what was left of the Black Hand.

There are no reports as to what took place between Ilić and Apis during the alleged meeting, but soon Apis's righthand man and fellow Black Hander, Serbian Major Vojislav Tankosić, who by this time was in charge of guerrilla training, called a Serbian irredentist planning meeting in Toulouse, France. Amongst those summoned to the Toulouse meeting was Muhamed Mehmedbašić, a Muslim carpenter from Herzegovina. According to Luigi Albertini writing in 1942, Mehmedbašić was a member of the Black Hand, having been sworn into the organization by Black Hand Provincial Director for Bosnia and Herzegovina Vladimir Gacinović and Danilo Ilić. Mehmedbašić was (here quoting Albertini paraphrasing Mehmedbašić) "eager to carry out an act of terrorism to revive the revolutionary spirit of Bosnia." During this January 1914 meeting, various possible Austro-Hungarian targets for assassination were discussed, including Franz Ferdinand. However, the participants decided only to dispatch Mehmed Mehmedbašić to Sarajevo, to kill the Governor of Bosnia, Oskar Potiorek.

According to Mehmedbašić while he was traveling to Bosnia and Herzegovina from France, police searched his train for a thief. Thinking the police might be after him, he threw his weapons (a dagger and a bottle of poison) in the lavatory. Once he arrived in Bosnia and Herzegovina he wrote to Gacinović and did nothing more until Ilić wrote to him to summon him to Mostar. On 26 March 1914, Ilić informed Mehmedbašić that Belgrade (meaning the Black Hand) thought that an attack of Franz Ferdinand instead of the Potiorek would be far more important and that they would support it. (Apis later boasted to the Serbian Court that he ordered the assassination of Franz Ferdinand in his position as head of the Intelligence Department, however Apis made the unproven claims in 1917 attempting to save his own life since he was about to be executed for high treason.)

=== The assassination team ===
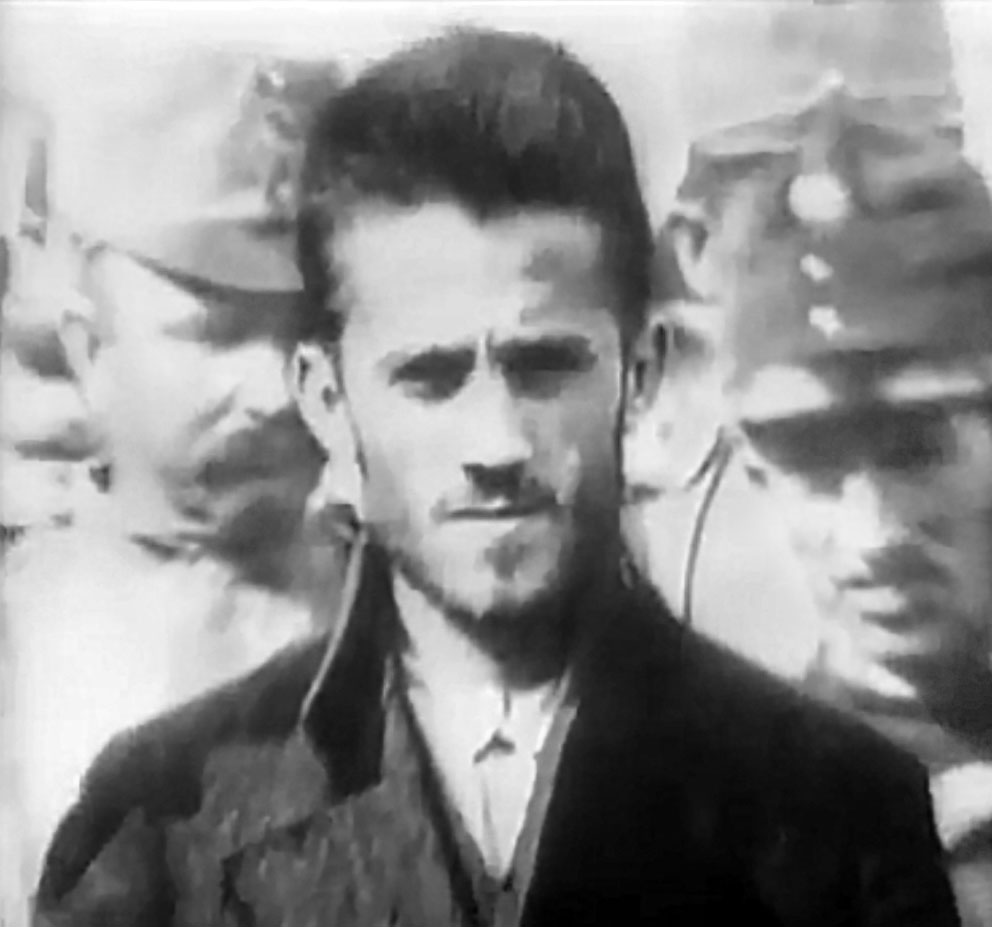
Gavrilo Princip outside the courthouse

Unknown to the Black Hand, a second plot against the archduke had arisen that spring of 1914 when student Gavrilo Princip was shown a newspaper cutting announcing Archduke Franz Ferdinand of Austria's visit to Bosnia in June, by his friend and fellow Young Bosnia member Nedeljko Čabrinović. At the time the two young Bosnian Serbs were in Belgrade eager to return to Austrian-occupied Bosnia to commit an attack on an imperial official, what they saw as performing the ultimate act of heroism. Princip asked another friend Trifko Grabež to join the plot, and then wrote to Ilić, his former roommate and confidante, telling him about the plan and asking him to recruit people in Sarajevo.

For the assassination Ilić recruited seventeen-year-old Sarajevo high-school student Vaso Čubrilović, eighteen-year-old student Cvjetko Popović, as well as Mehmed Mehmedbašić, shortly after Orthodox Easter (as given by Dedijer: 19 April 1914), as testified by Ilić, Čubrilović, and Popović at the Sarajevo trial. Princip, Grabež, and Čabrinović testified at the Sarajevo trial that at about the same time (a little after Easter), they approached a fellow Bosnian Serb and former guerrilla fighter known to be well connected and with access to arms, Milan Ciganović, and through him Major Tankosić and reached an agreement to receive arms and get smuggled across the Serbian border back into Bosnia with the weapons.

A principal agreement was quickly reached, but the delivery of the weapons was delayed for more than a month. The assassins met with Ciganović and he put them off. At one point, Ciganović told Grabež: "Nothing doing, the old Emperor is ill and the Heir Apparent [sic] will not go to Bosnia." When Emperor Franz Joseph's health recovered, the operation was a "go" again. Tankosić gave the assassins one FN Model 1910 pistol. They practised shooting a few rounds of scarce and expensive .380 ACP pistol ammunition in a park near Belgrade.

The rest of the weapons were finally delivered on 26 May. The three assassins from Belgrade testified that Major Tankosić, directly and through Ciganović, not only provided six hand grenades and four new Browning FN Model 1910 automatic pistols with .380 ACP ammunition, but also money, suicide pills, training, a special map with the location of gendarmes marked, knowledge of contacts on a clandestine "tunnel" used to infiltrate agents and arms into Austria-Hungary, and a small card authorizing the use of that tunnel. Major Tankosić confirmed to the journalist and historian Luciano Magrini that he provided the bombs and pistols and was responsible for training Princip, Grabež, and Čabrinović and that he (Tankosić) initiated the idea of the suicide pills.

=== The secret route ===
Route of the assassins from Belgrade to Sarajevo

Route of the weapons from Belgrade to Sarajevo

Princip, Grabež, and Čabrinović left Belgrade by boat on 28 May and traveled along the Sava river to Šabac where they handed the small card to Captain Popović of the Serbian Border Guard. Popović, in turn, provided them with a letter to Serbian Captain Prvanović, and filled out a form with the names of three customs officials whose identities they could assume and thereby receive discounted train tickets for the ride to Loznica, a small border town.

When Princip, Grabež, and Čabrinović reached Loznica on 29 May, Captain Prvanović summoned three of his revenue sergeants to discuss the best way to cross the border undetected. While waiting for the sergeants to arrive, Princip and Grabež had a falling out with Čabrinović over Čabrinović's repeated violations of operational security. Čabrinović handed over the weapons he was carrying to Princip and Grabež. Princip told Čabrinović to go alone to Zvornik, make an official crossing there using Grabež's ID card and then go on to Tuzla and link back up.

On the morning of 30 May, Prvanović's revenue sergeants assembled and Sergeant Budivoj Grbić accepted the task and led Princip and Grabež by foot to Isaković's Island, a small island in the middle of the Drina river that separated Serbia from Bosnia. They and their weapons reached the island on 31 May. Grbić passed the terrorists and their weapons to the agents of the Serbian Narodna Odbrana for transport into Austro-Hungarian territory and from safe-house to safe-house. Princip and Grabež crossed into Austria-Hungary on the evening of 1 June. Princip and Grabež and the weapons were passed from agent to agent until on 3 June they arrived in Tuzla. They left the weapons in the hands of the Narodna Odbrana agent Miško Jovanović and rejoined Čabrinović.

The Narodna Odbrana agents reported their activities to the Narodna Odbrana President, Božidar Janković, who in turn reported to the then Serbian Caretaker Prime Minister Nikola Pašić. The report to Pašić added the name of a new military conspirator, Serbian Major Kosta Todorović, Boundary Commissioner and Director of Serbian Military Intelligence Services for the frontier line from Rada to Ljubovija. Pašić's handwritten notes from the briefing (estimated by Dedijer to have taken place on 5 June) included the nickname of one of the assassins ("Trifko" Grabež) and also the name of Major Tankosić. The Austrians later captured the report, Pašić's handwritten notes, and additional corroborating documents.

Čabrinović's father was a Sarajevo police official. In Tuzla, Čabrinović bumped into one of his father's friends, Sarajevo Police Detective Ivan Vila, and struck up a conversation. By coincidence, Princip, Grabež and Čabrinović boarded the same train for Sarajevo as Detective Vila. Čabrinović inquired of the detective the date of Franz Ferdinand's visit to Sarajevo. The next morning, Čabrinović passed on the news to his fellow assassins that the assassination would be on 28 June.

On arriving in Sarajevo on 4 June, Princip, Grabež, and Čabrinović went their separate ways. Princip checked in with Ilić, visited his family in Hadžici and returned to Sarajevo on 6 June taking up residence at Ilić's mother's house with Ilić. Grabež joined his family in Pale. Čabrinović moved back into his father's house in Sarajevo.

On 14 June, Ilić went to Tuzla to bring the weapons to Sarajevo. Miško Jovanović hid the weapons in a large box of sugar. On 15 June, the two went separately by train to Doboj where Jovanović handed off the box to Ilić. Later that day, Ilić returned to Sarajevo by train, being careful to transfer to a local train outside Sarajevo and then quickly transfer to a tram to avoid police detection. Once at his mother's house, Ilić hid the weapons in a suitcase under a sofa. Then, on approximately 17 June, Ilić traveled to Brod (Dedijer puts it on 16 June, but trial records put it on 18 June). Questioned at trial, Ilić gave a confusing explanation of the reason for his trip, first saying he had gone to Brod to prevent the assassination and then saying he had returned to Sarajevo from Brod to prevent the assassination. Dedijer puts forward the thesis (citing Bogijević) that Ilić went to Brod to meet an emissary of Apis, Djuro Ŝarac, who had instructions to cancel the assassination and then later Rade Malobabić was dispatched from Serbia to Sarajevo to reauthorize the assassination.

=== Eve of the attacks ===
Ilić began handing out the weapons on 27 June. Until that day, Ilić had kept the identities of the assassins from Belgrade secret from those he had recruited locally and vice versa. Then, that night, as Mehmedbašić told Albertini: "On the eve of the outrage Ilić introduced me to Princip in a Sarajevo café with the words 'Mehmedbašić who to-morrow is to be with us.'" The three sent a postcard to Black Hand Provincial Director for Bosnia and Herzegovina Vladimir Gaćinović in France.

== Assassination ==
=== Motorcade ===
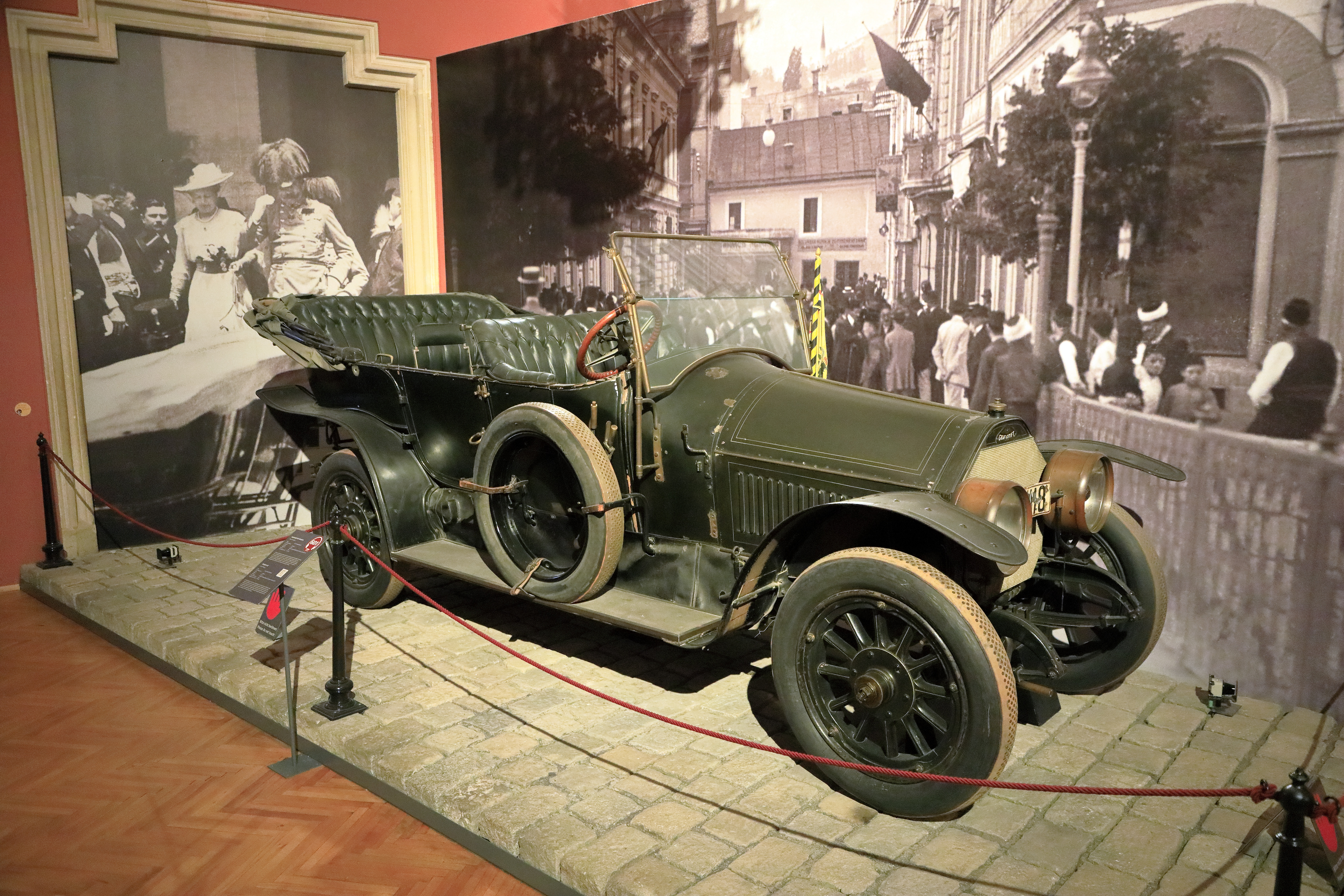
The 1911 Gräf & Stift 28/32 PS Double Phaeton in which Archduke Franz Ferdinand was riding at the time of his assassination, Museum of Military History, Vienna (2023)

On the morning of Sunday 28 June 1914, Ilić positioned the six assassins along the motorcade route. Ilić walked the street, exhorting the assassins to bravery. Franz Ferdinand and his party proceeded by train from Ilidža Spa to Sarajevo. Governor Oskar Potiorek met the party at Sarajevo station. Six automobiles were waiting. By mistake, three local police officers got into the first car with the chief officer of special security; the special security officers who were supposed to accompany their chief got left behind. The second car carried the Mayor and the Chief of Police of Sarajevo. The third car in the motorcade was a Gräf & Stift 28/32 PS open sports car with its top folded down. Franz Ferdinand, Sophie, Governor Potiorek, and Lieutenant Colonel Count Franz von Harrach rode in this third car. The motorcade's first stop on the preannounced program was for a brief inspection of a military barracks. According to the program, at 10:00 am, the motorcade was to leave the barracks for the town hall by way of the Appel Quay.

Security arrangements within Sarajevo were limited. The local military commander, General Michael von Appel, proposed that troops line the intended route but was told that this would offend the loyal citizenry. Protection for the visiting party was accordingly left to the Sarajevo police, of whom only about 60 were on duty on the Sunday of the visit.

=== Bombing ===
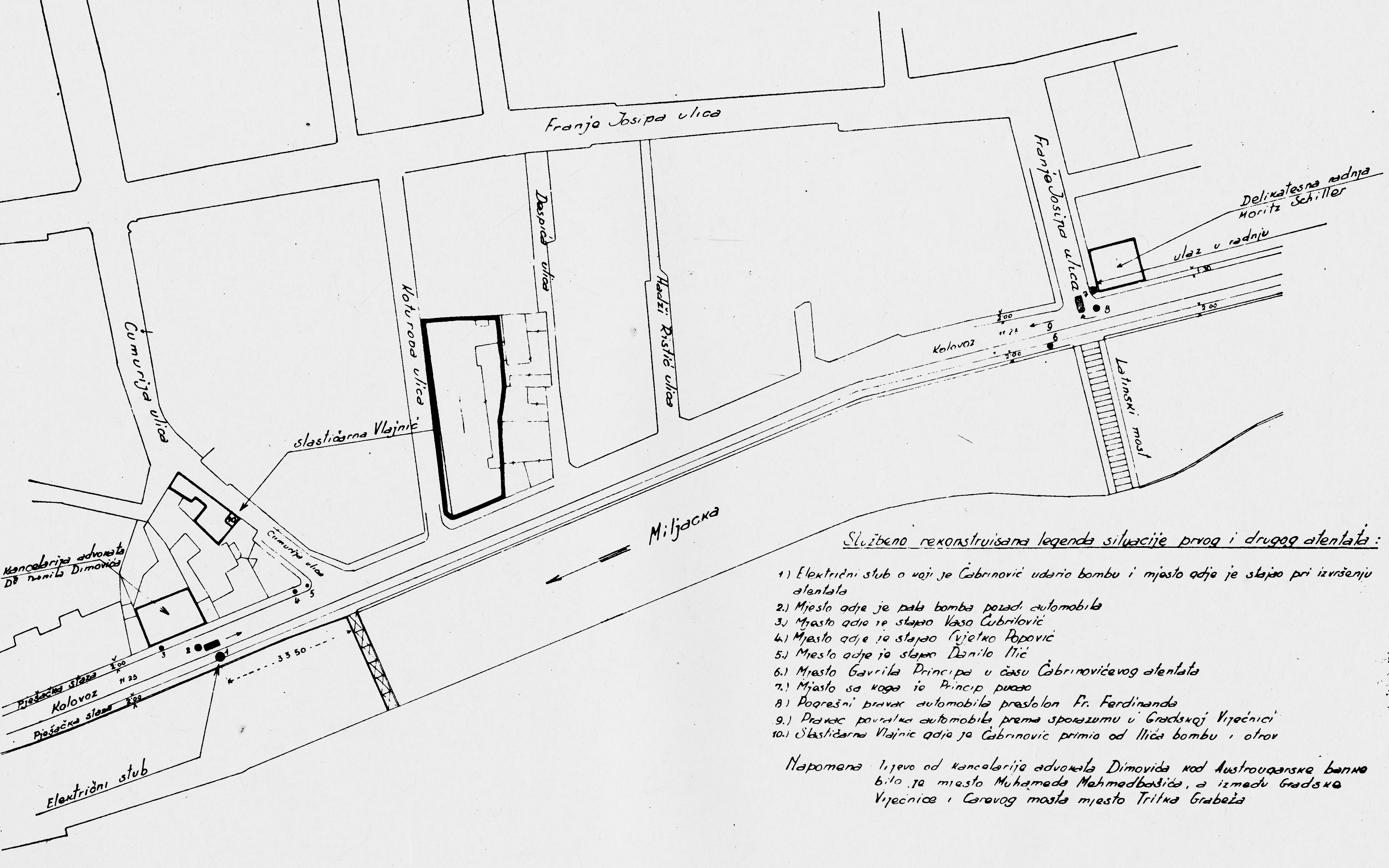
A map annotated with the events of 28 June 1914, from an official report

The motorcade passed the first assassin, Mehmedbašić. Danilo Ilić had placed him in front of the garden of the Mostar Café and armed him with a bomb. Mehmedbašić failed to act. Ilić had placed Vaso Čubrilović next to Mehmedbašić, arming him with a pistol and a bomb. He too failed to act. Further along the route, Ilić had placed Nedeljko Čabrinović on the opposite side of the street near the Miljacka river, arming him with a bomb.

At 10:10 am, Franz Ferdinand's car approached and Čabrinović threw his bomb. The bomb bounced off the folded back convertible cover into the street. The bomb's timed detonator caused it to explode under the next car, putting that car out of action, leaving a 1-foot-diameter (0.30 m), 6.5-inch-deep (170 mm) crater, and wounding 16–20 people.

Čabrinović swallowed his cyanide pill and jumped into the Miljacka river. Čabrinović survived the suicide attempt, as the old cyanide only induced vomiting, and the Miljacka was only 13 cm deep due to the hot, dry summer. Police dragged Čabrinović out of the river, and he was severely beaten by the crowd before being taken into custody.

The procession sped away toward the Town Hall, leaving the disabled car behind. Cvjetko Popović, Gavrilo Princip, and Trifun Grabež failed to act as the motorcade passed them at high speed.

=== Town Hall reception ===
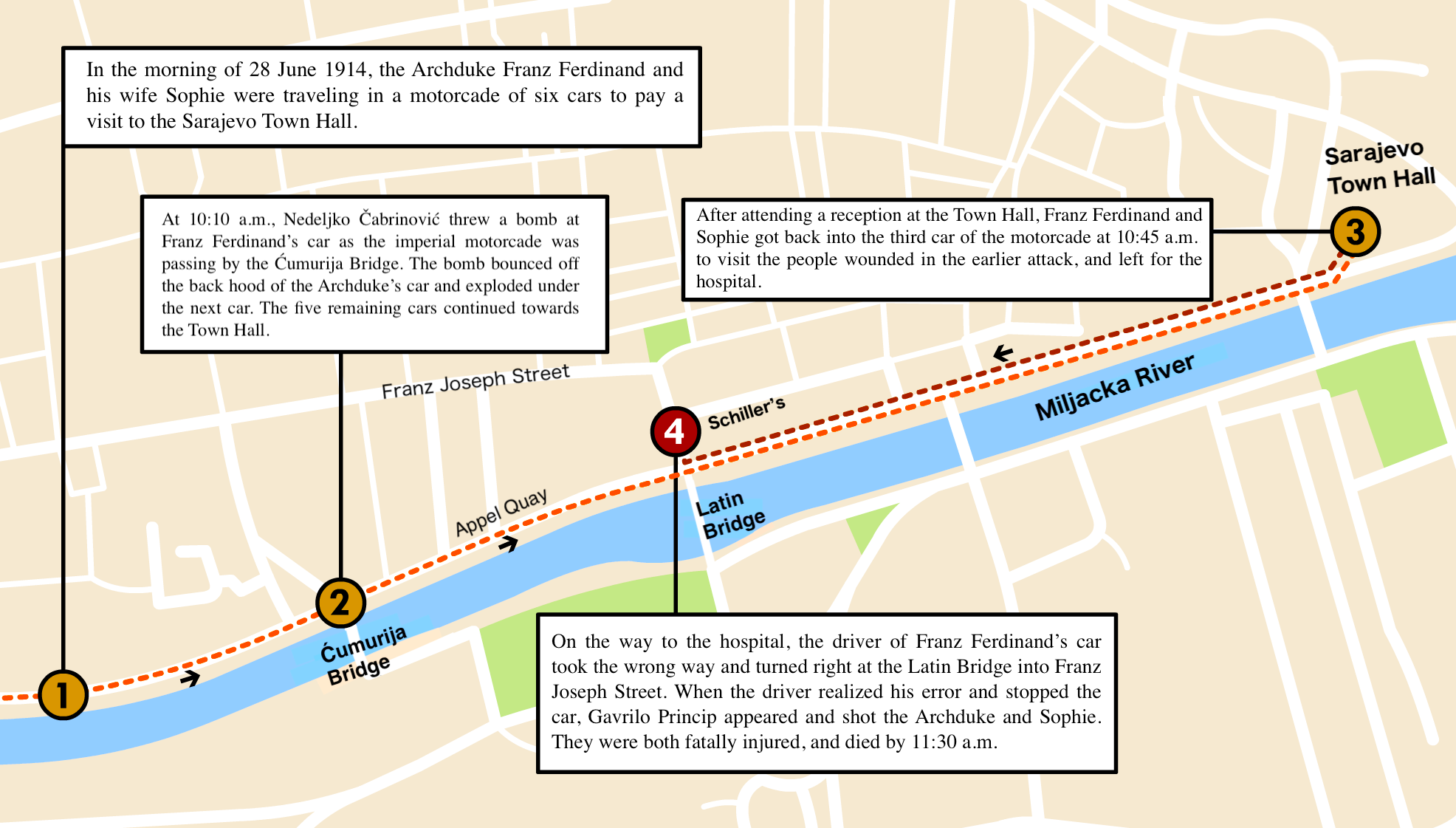
A map showing the route of Archduke Franz Ferdinand's motorcade

Arriving at the Town Hall for a scheduled reception, Franz Ferdinand showed signs of stress, interrupting a prepared speech of welcome by Mayor Fehim Čurčić to protest: "Mr. Mayor, I came here on a visit and I am greeted with bombs. It is outrageous." Duchess Sophie then whispered into Franz Ferdinand's ear, and after a pause, Franz Ferdinand said to the mayor: "Now you may speak." He then became calm and the mayor gave his speech. Franz Ferdinand had to wait as his own speech, still wet with blood from being in the damaged car, was brought to him. To the prepared text he added a few remarks about the day's events thanking the people of Sarajevo for their ovations "as I see in them an expression of their joy at the failure of the attempt at assassination."

Officials and members of the Archduke's party discussed what to do next. The archduke's chamberlain, Baron Rumerskirch, proposed that the couple remain at the Town Hall until troops could be brought into the city to line the streets. Governor-General Oskar Potiorek vetoed this suggestion on the grounds that soldiers coming straight from maneuvers would not have the dress uniforms appropriate for such duties. "Do you think that Sarajevo is full of assassins?" he concluded.

Franz Ferdinand and Sophie gave up their planned program in favour of visiting the wounded from the bombing, at the hospital. Count Harrach took up a position on the left-hand running board of Franz Ferdinand's car to protect the Archduke from any assault from the river side of the street. This is confirmed by photographs of the scene outside the Town Hall. At 10:45 a.m, Franz Ferdinand and Sophie got back into the motorcade, once again in the third car. To ensure the safety of the couple, General Oskar Potiorek decided that the imperial motorcade should travel straight along the Appel Quay to the Sarajevo Hospital so that they could avoid the crowded city center. However, Potiorek failed to communicate his decision to the drivers. As a result, the Archduke's driver, Leopold Lojka, took a right turn at the Latin Bridge just as the two drivers ahead of him had done. According to the historian Joachim Remak, the reason for this is that Potiorek's aide Erik von Merizzi was in the hospital, and was therefore unable to give Lojka the information about the change in plans and the driving route. The Sarajevo Chief of Police Edmund Gerde, who had earlier repeatedly warned Potiorek of insufficient security precautions for the imperial visit, was asked by one of the Archduke's aides to tell the drivers of the new route, but in the confusion and tensions of the moment, he neglected to do so.

=== Fatal shooting ===
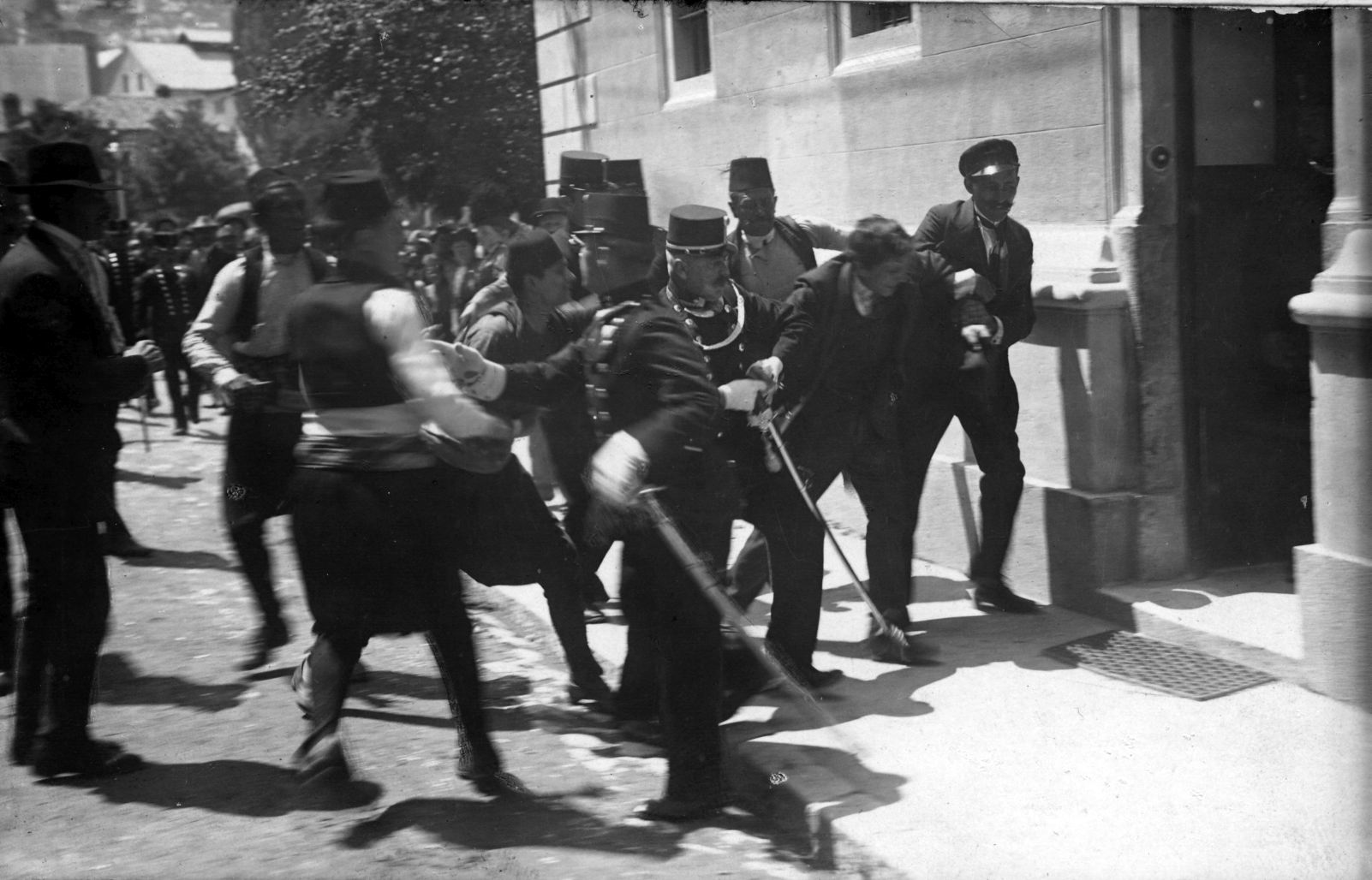
Arrest of a suspect in Sarajevo during the aftermath of the assassination

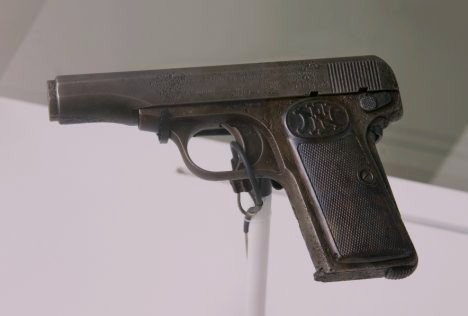
FN Model 1910 pistol (s/n 19074) displayed at the Museum of Military History, Vienna, 2009

After learning that the first assassination attempt had been unsuccessful, Princip thought about a position to assassinate the Archduke on his return journey, and decided to move to a position near the Latin Bridge, in front of Schiller's Delicatessen (this building now houses the Museum of Sarajevo 1878–1918). At this point, the first and second cars of the Archduke's motorcade suddenly turned right into a side street, leaving the Appel Quay. When the Archduke's driver followed their route, Governor Potiorek, who was sharing the third vehicle with the Imperial couple, called out to the driver to stop as he was going the wrong way. The driver applied the brakes, and when he attempted to put the car into reverse gear he accidentally stalled the engine close to where Princip was standing. The assassin stepped up to the footboard of the car, and shot Franz Ferdinand and Sophie at point-blank range using a Belgian-made Fabrique Nationale model 1910 .380 caliber pistol. Pistol serial numbers 19074, 19075, 19120 and 19126 were supplied to the assassins. Richard Belfield states that Princip used #19074 but Ian Howgate, a researcher of the Bosnian archives claims Princip used #19075. While 3 of the model 1910 pistols are at the Museum of Military History the fourth, 19075, is missing. According to Albertini, "the first bullet wounded the Archduke in the jugular vein, the second inflicted an abdominal wound on the Duchess". Princip tried to shoot himself, but was immediately seized and arrested. At his sentencing, Princip stated that his intention had been to kill Governor Potiorek, rather than Sophie.

After being shot, Sophie immediately fell unconscious and collapsed onto Franz Ferdinand's legs. The Archduke, too, lost consciousness while being driven to the Governor's residence for medical treatment. As reported by Count Harrach, Franz Ferdinand's last words were "Sophie, Sophie! Don't die! Live for our children!" followed by six or seven utterances of "It is nothing", in response to Harrach's inquiry as to Franz Ferdinand's injury. These utterances were followed by a violent choking sound caused by hemorrhage. The imperial couple were dead by 11:30 a.m on 28 June 1914; Sophie was dead on arrival at the Governor's residence, and Franz Ferdinand died 10 minutes later.

There is a myth which states that Princip had eaten a sandwich at Schiller's delicatessen just prior to the shooting, but there are no primary sources from the time which mention this. This myth likely originated from the 2001 novel Twelve Fingers, which presents a fictionalized version of the events of the assassination that includes the sandwich.

=== Funeral ===
The bodies were transported to Trieste by the battleship SMS Viribus Unitis and then to Vienna by special train. The funeral was arranged by the Obersthofmeister of the Royal Household Alfred, 2nd Prince of Montenuovo, who was said to have been a lifelong enemy of Franz Ferdinand. With the Emperor's connivance, he decided to turn the funeral into a massive and vicious snub of the assassinated couple. Even though most foreign royalty had planned to attend, they were pointedly disinvited and the funeral was attended by just the immediate imperial family, with the dead couple's three children excluded from the few public ceremonies. The Archduke's friend Kaiser Wilhelm II was invited so that the Imperial Cabinet could consult him on foreign policy, but he declined to attend; although he publicly claimed it was due to a case of lumbago, Imperial Chancellor Theobald von Bethmann Hollweg revealed that the real reason was security concerns. The officer corps was forbidden to salute the funeral train, and this led to a minor revolt led by Archduke Karl, the new heir presumptive. The public viewing of the coffins was curtailed severely and even more scandalously, Montenuovo tried unsuccessfully to make the couple's children foot the bill. Sophie's coffin was slanted down from her husband's to reassert her lower social status, and gloves were placed on top of her casket as was traditional for a lady-in-waiting. The Archduke and his wife were interred at Artstetten Castle because the Duchess could not be buried in the Imperial Crypt.

=== Aftermath ===
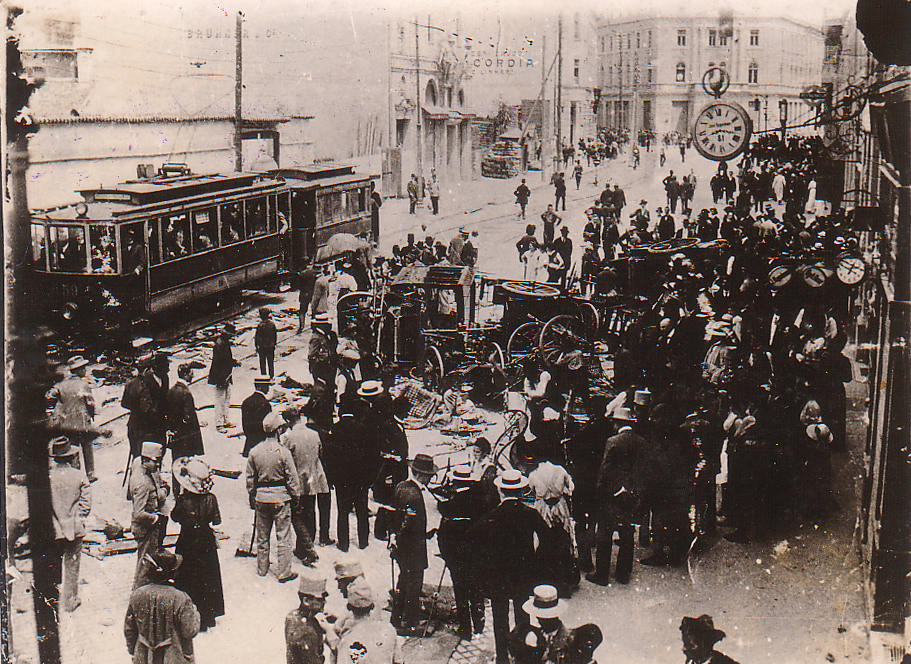
Crowds on the streets in the aftermath of the Anti-Serb riots in Sarajevo, 29 June 1914

All of the assassins were eventually caught. Those in Austro-Hungarian custody were tried together with members of the infiltration route who had helped deliver them and their weapons to Sarajevo. Mehmedbašić, the only Bosnian Muslim among the conspirators, was arrested in Montenegro by local authorities but managed to escape from the Nikšić prison before his extradition could take place (possibly with help from the gendarmes who were guarding him and were consequently put under arrest). He later resurfaced in Serbia where he joined Major Tankosić's Chetnik detachment during the war, in 1916 the Serbian government imprisoned him on fabricated charges of treason during the Salonika trial, he was released in 1919 (see criminal penalty section below).

Anti-Serb rioting broke out in Sarajevo and various other places within Austria-Hungary in the hours following the assassination until order was restored by the military. On the night of the assassination, country-wide anti-Serb pogroms and demonstrations were also organized in other parts of the Austro-Hungarian Empire, particularly on the territory of modern-day Bosnia and Herzegovina and Croatia. They were organized and stimulated by Oskar Potiorek, the Austro-Hungarian governor of Bosnia and Herzegovina. The first anti-Serb demonstrations, led by the followers of Josip Frank, were organized in the early evening of 28 June in Zagreb. The following day, anti-Serb demonstrations in Sarajevo became more violent and could be characterized as a pogrom. The police and local authorities in the city did nothing to prevent anti-Serb violence. Writer Ivo Andrić referred to the violence in Sarajevo as the "Sarajevo frenzy of hate." Two Serbs were killed on the first day of pogrom in Sarajevo, many were attacked, while around 1,000 houses, shops, schools and institutions (such as banks, hotels, printing houses) owned by Serbs were razed or pillaged.

Following the assassination, Franz Joseph's daughter, Marie Valerie, noted that her father expressed his greater confidence in the new heir presumptive, his grandnephew Archduke Charles. The emperor admitted to his daughter, regarding the assassination: "For me, it is a relief from a great worry."

== Trials and punishment ==
=== Sarajevo trial (October 1914) ===
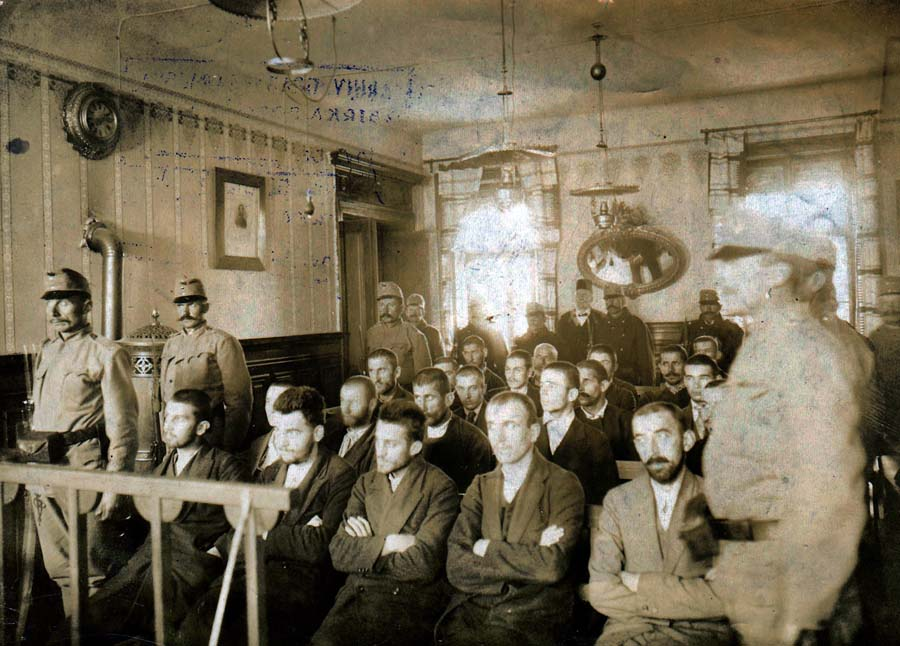
The Sarajevo trial in progress. Princip is seated in the center of the first row.

Austro-Hungarian authorities arrested and prosecuted the Sarajevo assassins together with the agents and peasants who had assisted them on their way. The majority of the defendants were charged with conspiracy to commit high treason involving official circles in the Kingdom of Serbia. Conspiracy to commit high treason carried a maximum sentence of death which conspiracy to commit simple murder did not. The trial was held from 12 to 23 October with the verdict and sentences announced on 28 October 1914.

The adult defendants, facing the death penalty, portrayed themselves at trial as unwilling participants in the conspiracy. The examination of defendant Veljko Čubrilović (who helped coordinate the transport of the weapons and was a Narodna Odbrana agent) is illustrative of this effort. Čubrilović stated to the court: "Princip glared at me and very forcefully said 'If you want to know, it is for that reason and we are going to carry out an assassination of the Heir and if you know about it, you have to be quiet. If you betray it, you and your family will be destroyed.'" Under questioning by defense counsel Čubrilović described in more detail the basis of the fears that he said had compelled him to cooperate with Princip and Grabež." Čubrilović explained that he was afraid a revolutionary organization capable of committing great atrocities stood behind Princip and that he therefore feared his house would be destroyed and his family killed if he did not comply and explained that he knew such an organization existed in Serbia, at least at one time. When pressed for why he risked the punishment of the law, and did not take the protection of the law against these threats he responded: "I was more afraid of terror than the law." Another Narodna Odbrana agent, Miško Jovanović, also claimed to have been against the assassination.

The three members of the original assassination team acknowledged full responsibility for their acts, proclaiming their ideal of a liberated and united South Slav people, exonerating Serbia and the Narodna Odbrana whose responsibility the prosecution tried to prove; however the court did not believe the defendants' statements as they differed from their depositions made at the preliminary investigation. Princip focused on taking full responsibility for the crime on himself, and stated: "Our enterprise was purely private and in no way official as the prosecution asserts. Serbia has no hand in it and cannot be held responsible for our deed." He then asked: "No one else knew of it beyond Ciganović and ourselves. How could Serbia be brought into the affair?" Princip deposed under cross-examination: "I am a Yugoslav nationalist and I believe in unification of all South Slavs in whatever form of state and that it be free of Austria." Princip was then asked how he intended to realize his goal and responded: "By means of terror." Cabrinović testified that he was motivated to kill Franz Ferdinand because he saw him as a danger to the Slavs and to Serbia, something he claimed to have heard in cafés from students and citizens. Grabež stated that he would never have taken part had he known that it would lead to a European war. In spite of the absence of proof, the Sarajevo Court deemed that Serbian military circles were also implicated and thus the verdict ran: "The court regards it as proved by the evidence that both Narodna Odbrana and military circles in the Kingdom of Serbia in charge of the espionage service, collaborated in the outrage."

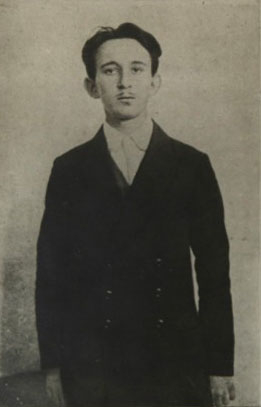
Photograph of Vaso Čubrilović taken in 1914 during the Sarajevo trial (October 1914) by an unknown photographer.

Prison terms, death sentences and acquittals were as follows:

Name	Sentence
Gavrilo Princip	20 years
Nedjelko Čabrinović	20 years
Trifun Grabež	20 years
Vaso Čubrilović	16 years
Cvjetko Popović	13 years
Lazar Đukić	10 years
Danilo Ilić	Death by hanging (executed 3 February 1915)
Veljko Čubrilović	Death by hanging (executed 3 February 1915)
Neđo Kerović	Death by hanging; commuted to 20 years in prison by Kaiser Franz-Joseph based on the recommendation of the Finance Minister
Miško Jovanović	Death by hanging (executed 3 February 1915)
Jakov Milović	Death by hanging; commuted to life in prison by Kaiser Franz-Joseph based on recommendation of the court and Finance Minister
Mitar Kerović	Life in prison
Ivo Kranjcević	10 years
Branko Zagorac	3 years
Marko Perin	3 years
Cvijan Stjepanović	7 years
Nine defendants	Acquitted

At trial, Čabrinović had expressed his regrets for the murders. Following sentencing, Čabrinović received a letter of complete forgiveness from the three young children the assassins had orphaned. Čabrinović and Princip died of tuberculosis in prison. Those under the age of 20 years at the time of the crime could receive a maximum sentence of 20 years under Austrian-Hungarian law. The court heard arguments regarding Princip's age, as there was some doubt as to his true date of birth but concluded that Princip was under 20 at the time of the assassination. Because Bosnia and Herzegovina had not been assigned to Austria or to Hungary, the Austro-Hungarian Finance Minister administered Bosnia and Herzegovina and had responsibility for recommending clemency to the emperor.

=== Salonika trial (spring 1917) ===
From late 1916 into early 1917, secret peace talks took place between Austria-Hungary and France. There is evidence that parallel discussions were held between Austria-Hungary and Serbia with Prime Minister Pašić dispatching his righthand man Stojan Protić and Regent Alexander dispatching his confidant Colonel Petar Živković to Geneva on secret business. Charles I of Austria laid out Austria-Hungary's key demand for returning Serbia to the control of the Serbian Government in exile: that Serbia should provide guarantees that there be no further political agitation emanating from Serbia against Austria-Hungary.

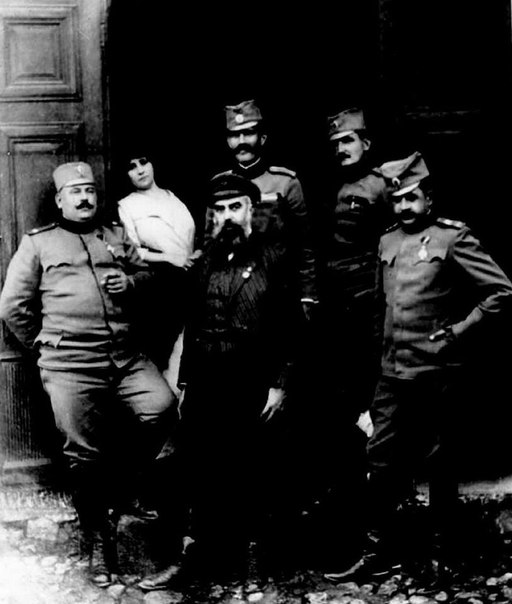
Indictees at the Salonika trial, after the verdict

For some time, Regent Alexander and officers loyal to him had planned to get rid of the military clique headed by Apis, as Apis represented a political threat to Alexander's power. The Austro-Hungarian peace demand gave added impetus to this plan.

On 15 March 1917 Apis and the officers loyal to him were indicted, on various false charges unrelated to Sarajevo, charges later described by historian John Paul Newman as fabricated and part of a staged trial intended to eliminate the organisation's leadership, (the case was retried before the Supreme Court of Serbia in 1953 and all defendants were exonerated), by Serbian Court Martial on the French-controlled Salonica front.

On 23 May Apis and eight of his associates were sentenced to death; two others were sentenced to 15 years in prison. One defendant died during the trial and the charges against him were dropped. The Serbian High Court reduced the number of death sentences to seven. Regent Alexander commuted four of the remaining death sentences, leaving just three death sentences in place. Amongst those tried, four of the defendants had confessed their roles in Sarajevo and their final sentences were as follows:

Name	Sentence
Apis	Death by firing squad (executed 26 June 1917) and 70 dinar court fee and additional witness fees
Ljuba Vulović	Death by firing squad (executed 26 June 1917) and 70 dinar court fee and additional witness fees
Rade Malobabić	Death by firing squad (executed 26 June 1917) and 70 dinar court fee and additional witness fees
Muhamed Mehmedbašić	15 years in prison (commuted and released in 1919) and 60 dinar court fee and additional witness fees

In justifying the executions, Prime Minister Pašić wrote to his envoy in London: "...Dimitrijević (Apis) besides everything else admitted he had ordered Franz Ferdinand to be killed. And now who could reprieve them?"

As the three condemned men were driven to their execution, Apis remarked to the driver: "Now it is clear to me and clear to you too, that I am to be killed today by Serbian rifles solely because I organized the Sarajevo outrage."

Vojislav Tankosić died in battle in late 1915 and so was not put on trial.

== Controversy about responsibility ==
=== Serbia's "warning" to Austria-Hungary ===
Following the assassinations, Serbian Ambassador to France Milenko Vesnić and Serbian Ambassador to Russia Miroslav Spalajković put out statements claiming that Serbia had warned Austria-Hungary of the impending assassination. Serbia soon thereafter denied making warnings and denied knowledge of the plot. Prime Minister Pašić himself made these denials to Az Est on 7 July and to the Paris edition of the New York Herald on 20 July. Other voices eventually spoke out on the "warning". As Serbian Education Minister Ljubomir Jovanović wrote in Krv Sloventsva, in late May or early June, Prime Minister Pašić reviewed the plot of the impending assassination with members of his cabinet. On 18 June, a telegram, lacking in specifics, ordered Serbia's Ambassador to Vienna, Jovan Jovanović Pižon, to warn Austria-Hungary that Serbia had reason to believe there was a conspiracy to assassinate Franz Ferdinand in Bosnia. On 21 June, Ambassador Jovanović met with Austro-Hungarian Finance Minister Leon Biliński. According to Serbian Military Attaché to Vienna, Colonel Lešjanin, Ambassador Jovanović, spoke to Biliński and "...stressed in general terms the risks the Archduke heir apparent [sic] might run from the inflamed public opinion in Bosnia and Serbia. Some serious personal misadventure might befall him. His journey might give rise to incidents and demonstrations that Serbia would deprecate but that would have fatal repercussions on Austro-Serbian relations." Jovanović came back from the meeting with Biliński and told Lešjanin that "...Biliński showed no sign of attaching great importance to the total message and dismissed it limiting himself to remarking when saying goodbye and thanking him: 'Let us hope nothing does happen.'" The Austro-Hungarian Finance Minister took no action based on Jovanović's remarks.

In 1924, J. Jovanović went public stating that his warning had been made on his own initiative, and what he said was that "Among the Serb youths (in the army) there may be one who will put a ball-cartridge in his rifle or revolver in place of a blank cartridge and he may fire it, the bullet might strike the man giving provocation (Franz Ferdinand)." J. Jovanović's account changed back and forth over the years and never adequately addressed Colonel Lešjanin's statement. Biliński did not speak openly on the subject, but his press department chief confirmed that a meeting had taken place including a vague warning, but there was no mention of an ethnic Serb Austro-Hungarian soldier shooting Franz Ferdinand.

In the days leading up to the assassination, Pašić was the caretaker prime minister because during this period the Serbian Government briefly fell to a political alliance led by the Serbian Military. The military favoured promoting Jovan Jovanović to Foreign Minister, and Jovanović's loyalties one might expect to have been divided and his orders therefore carried out poorly. By choosing a military loyalist to convey the message, and by not including any of the specifics such as the conspirators' names and weapons, Pašić, a survivor, hedged his bets against the various possible outcomes and consequences of the impending assassination.

=== Rade Malobabić ===
In 1914, Rade Malobabić was Serbian Military Intelligence's chief undercover operative against Austria-Hungary. His name appeared in Serbian documents captured by Austria-Hungary during the war. These documents describe the running of arms, munitions, and agents from Serbia into Austria-Hungary under Malobabić's direction.

Owing to the suppression by Serbia of Apis's confession and of the Salonika trial transcripts historians did not initially link Malobabić closely to the Sarajevo attack. Apis's confession, however, states that "I engaged Malobabić to organize the assassination on the occasion of the announced arrival of Franz Ferdinand to Sarajevo." At the Salonika trial, Colonel Ljubomir Vulović (head of the Serbian Frontiers Service) testified: 'In 1914 on occasion of my official trip from Loznica to Belgrade, I received a letter at the General Staff [signed by Marshal Radomir Putnik, Serbia's top military officer] noting that agents of Malobabić would come and a teacher whose name I don't recall (Danilo Ilić was a teacher but it is unclear if the teacher in question was Ilić as Ilić can be placed in Brod but not Loznica) so I could sent [sic] them into Bosnia.' Because of that 'I went to Loznica and either that day or very soon afterwards sent Rade and that teacher into Bosnia.' Soon thereafter occurred the Sarajevo assassination of Archduke Franz Ferdinand." On the eve of his execution, Malobabić told a priest: "They ordered me to go to Sarajevo when that assassination was to take place, and when everything was over, they ordered me to come back and fulfill other missions, and then there was the outbreak of the war." Vladimir Dedijer in The Road to Sarajevo presented additional testimonial evidence that Malobabić arrived in Sarajevo on the eve of the Sarajevo attack and gave the final go-ahead for the operation to Danilo Ilić. This meshes with Dedijer's theory that Djuro Ŝarac had given instructions to Ilić on 16 June canceling the assassination. Soon after their confessions, Serbia executed Malobabić, Vulović, and Apis on false charges. Serbia published no clarifications of their confessions with regards to the Sarajevo attack.

=== Theories of involvement by the "Black Hand" or Serbian military intelligence ===
An alternative theory to the Sarajevo attack being a Serbian Military Intelligence Operation was that it was a "Black Hand" operation. The "Black Hand" was a Serbian military society formed on 9 May 1911 by officers in the Royal Serbian Army, originating in the conspiracy group that assassinated the Serbian royal couple in May 1903, led by captain Dragutin Dimitrijević (Commonly referred to as "Apis").

After Serbia's victory over Bulgaria in Macedonia in the Balkan Wars, the "Black Hand" became moribund because of the death of its president and the failure to replace him, an inactive secretary, casualties, broken links between its three-man cells, and a drying up of funding. By 1914 the "Black Hand" was no longer operating under its constitution but rather as a creature of the Chief of Serbian Military Intelligence, Apis, and its active ranks were composed mostly of Serbian officers loyal to Apis. Apis's confession to ordering the operation that begins with the phrase "As the Chief of the Intelligence Department of the General Staff", the fact that the military chain of command was invoked, the moribund nature of the "Black Hand" and the fact that under the "Black Hand" constitution Article 16, such an assassination could only be ordered by a vote of the Supreme Council Directorate, the President or the Secretary, and no such order was made, are factors in favour of assigning responsibility to Serbian Military Intelligence. The fact that Milan Ciganović was involved, that the key officers involved were "Black Hand" members, that "Black Hand" Provincial Director for Bosnia and Herzegovina Vladimir Gaćinović was consulted and that there was no official budget for the operation favours assigning responsibility to the "Black Hand".

=== The newspaper clipping ===
At trial, it was noted that the three assassins from Belgrade tried to take all blame on themselves. Čabrinović claimed the idea of killing Franz Ferdinand came from a newspaper clipping he received in the mail at the end of March announcing Franz Ferdinand's planned visit to Sarajevo. He then showed the newspaper clipping to Princip and the next day they agreed they would kill Franz Ferdinand. Princip explained to the court he had already read about Franz Ferdinand's upcoming visit in German papers. Princip went on to testify that, at about the time of Easter (19 April), he wrote an allegorical letter to Ilić informing him of the plan to kill Franz Ferdinand. Grabež testified that he and Princip, also at about the time of Easter, agreed between them to make an assassination of either Governor Potiorek or Franz Ferdinand and a little later settled on Franz Ferdinand. The defendants refused or were unable to provide details under examination.

On 26 March Ilić and Mehmedbašić had already agreed to kill Franz Ferdinand based on instructions from Belgrade predating the newspaper clipping and the discussions amongst the three assassins in Belgrade.

=== Narodna Odbrana ===
Serbian Military Intelligence – through remnants of the "Black Hand" – penetrated the Narodna Odbrana, using its clandestine tunnel to smuggle the assassins and their weapons from Belgrade to Sarajevo. In the 5 June 1914 report by the President of the Narodna Odbrana Boža Milanović to Prime Minister Pašić, one can sense the frustration of the President over the hijacking of his organization in the final sentence dealing with Sarajevo: "Boža has informed all the agents that they should not receive anyone unless he produces the password given by Boža."

=== Milan Ciganović ===
Prime Minister Pašić received early information of the assassination plan. The information was received by Pašić early enough, according to Education Minister Ljubomir Jovanović, for the government to order the border guards to prevent the assassins from crossing. This places the cabinet minister's discussions in late May and the information release to some time before that. Albertini concluded that the source of the information was most likely Milan Ciganović. Bogičević made a more forceful case.

The circumstantial evidence against Ciganović includes his sinecure government job, his protection by the Chief of Police and Serbia's failure to arrest him (Austria-Hungary demanded Serbia arrest Major Vojislav Tankosić and Ciganović, but Serbia arrested only Tankosić and lied saying that Ciganović could not be found), Serbia's protection of Ciganović during the war, and the government's provision for Ciganović after it. In 1917, all of the Sarajevo conspirators within Serbia's control were tried at Salonika on false charges, except Ciganović, who even gave evidence against his comrades at the trial.

=== Russian military attaché's office ===
Apis's confession to ordering the assassination of Franz Ferdinand states that Russian Military Attaché Viktor Artamonov promised Russia's protection from Austria-Hungary if Serbia would ever come under attack. While admitting funding of the intelligence network in Austro-Hungary, Artamonov denied the involvement of his office in the assassination in an interview with Albertini. Artamonov stated that he went on vacation to Italy leaving Assistant Military Attaché Alexander Werchovsky in charge and though he was in daily contact with Apis he did not learn of Apis's role until after the war had ended. Albertini writes that he "remained unconvinced by the behavior of this officer." Werchovsky admitted the involvement of his office and then fell silent on the subject.

There is evidence that Russia was at least aware of the plot before 14 June. De Schelking writes:

On 1 June 1914 (14 June new calendar), Emperor Nicholas had an interview with King Charles I of Roumania, at Constanza. I was there at the time ... yet as far as I could judge from my conversation with members of his (Russian Foreign Minister Sergey Sazonov's) entourage, he (Sazonov) was convinced that if the Archduke (Franz Ferdinand) were out of the way, the peace of Europe would not be endangered.

== Consequences ==
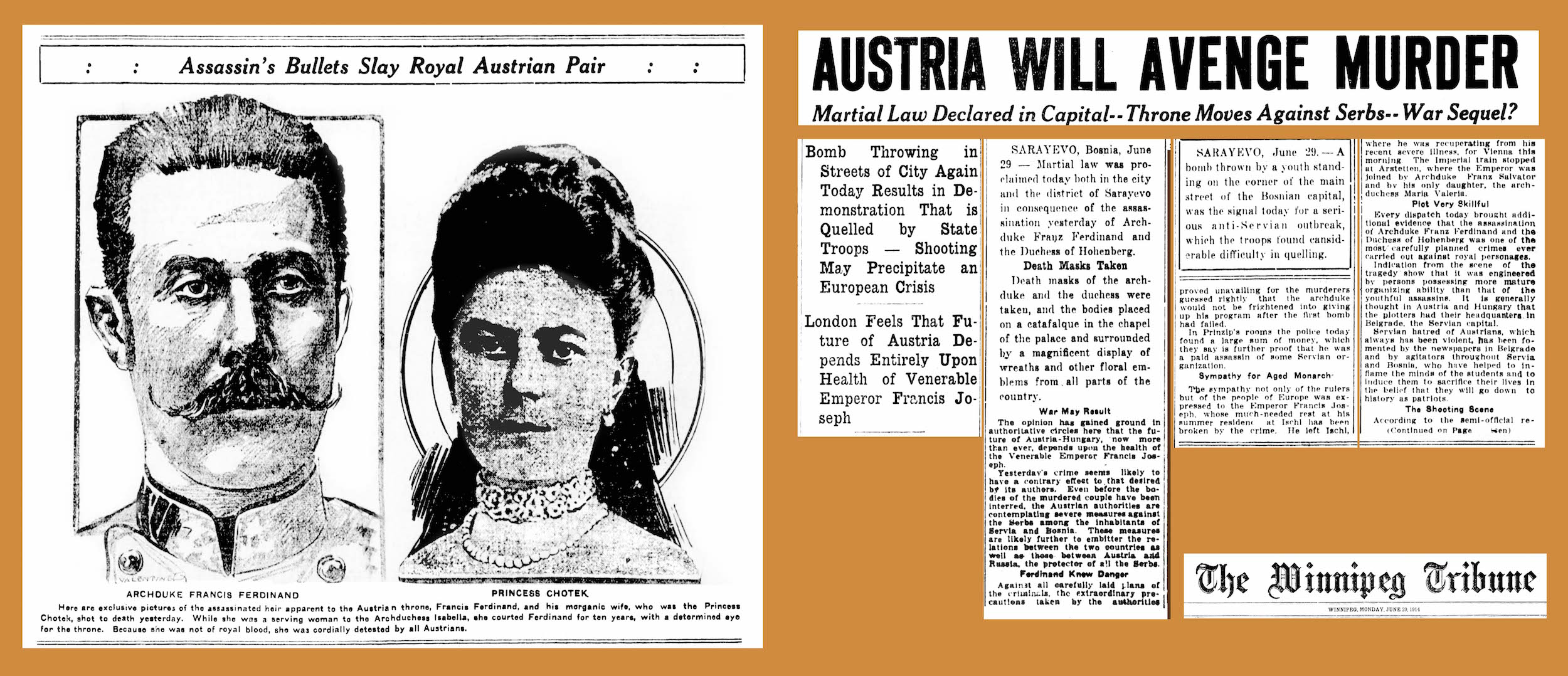
Grave implications of the assassination were immediately recognized, as in this 29 June article with subtitles "War Sequel?" and "War May Result", and stating the assassination was "engineered by persons having a more mature organizing ability than that of the youthful assassins".

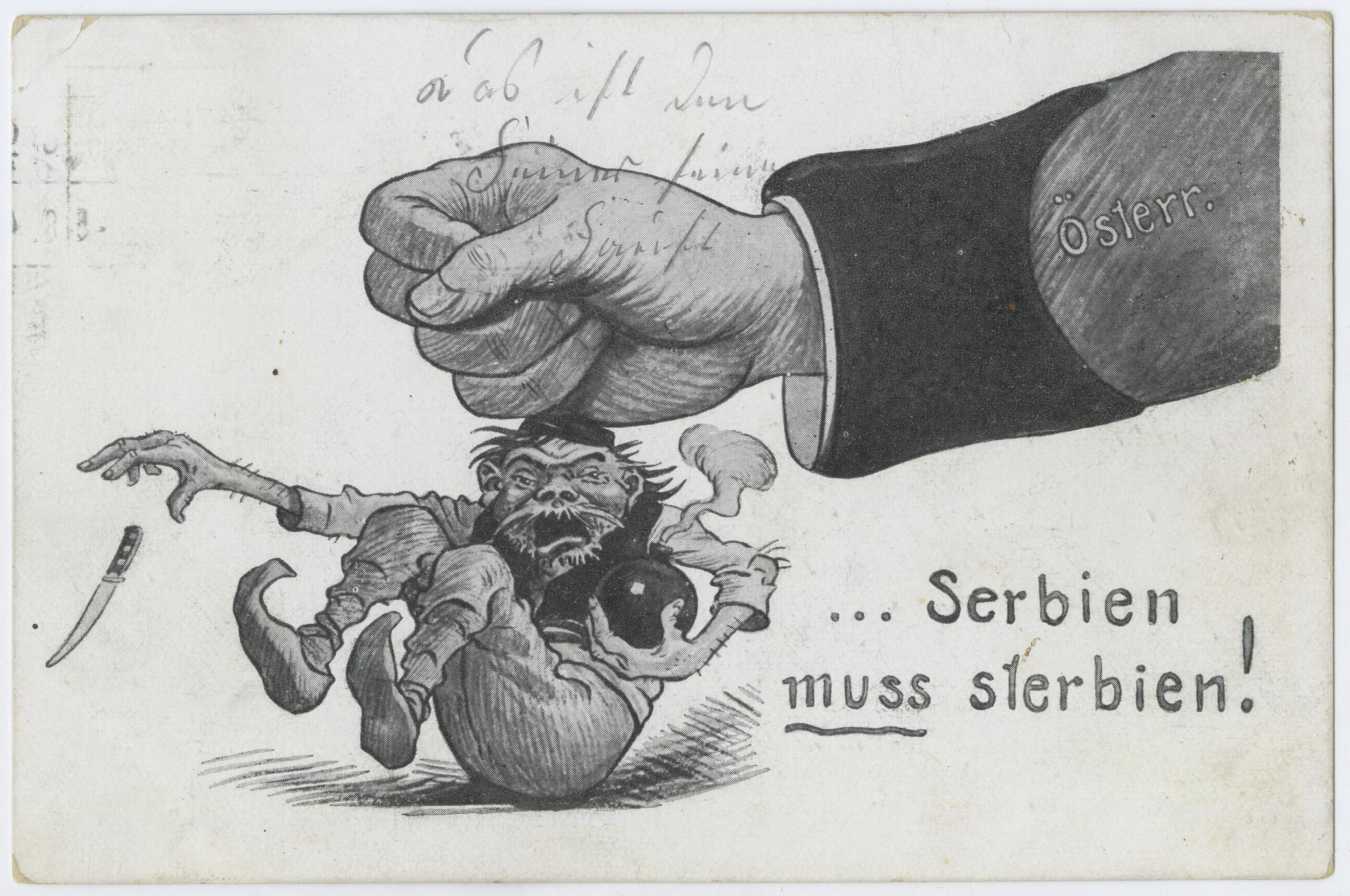
Serbien muss sterb[i]en! ("Serbia must die!"; last word altered to rhyme). The propaganda caricature depicts Austria crushing the ape-like Serb.

In August 1914, The Independent described the assassination as a "deplorable but relatively insignificant" reason for which

the financial system of the world is in chaos, that international commerce is suspended, that industries are everywhere demoralized and families ruined, and that millions of men in Europe have taken up arms with the intent to slaughter each other.

"It may be doubted whether the Archduke [is] worth all this carnage", the magazine wrote. The murder produced widespread shock across European royal houses, and there was initially much sympathy for the Austrian position. Ordinary people did not really care about what happened, and on the evening of the assassination the crowds in Vienna listened to music and drank wine, as if nothing had happened.

Within two days of the assassination, Austria-Hungary and Germany advised Serbia that it should open an investigation, but Secretary-General to the Serbian Ministry of Foreign Affairs Slavko Grujić, replied: "Nothing had been done so far and the matter did not concern the Serbian Government." An angry exchange followed between the Austrian Chargé d'Affaires at Belgrade and Grujić. After conducting a criminal investigation, verifying that Germany would honor its military alliance, and persuading the sceptical Hungarian prime minister Count István Tisza, Austria-Hungary issued a formal letter to the government of Serbia on 23 July 1914. The letter reminded Serbia of its commitment to respect the Great Powers' decision regarding Bosnia and Herzegovina, and to maintain good neighborly relations with Austria-Hungary. The letter contained specific demands that Serbia should accept, including the suppression of the publication of propaganda advocating the violent destruction of Austria-Hungary, the removal of the people behind this propaganda from the Serbian Military, the dissolution of the Serbian nationalist organization Narodna Odbrana, the arrest of the people on Serbian soil who were involved in the assassination plot and the prevention of the clandestine shipment of arms and explosives from Serbia to Austria-Hungary. It also demanded that Austro-Hungarian officials should take part in the Serbian inquiry into the assassination plot.

This letter became known as the July Ultimatum. Austria-Hungary stated that if Serbia did not accept all of the demands in total within 48 hours, it would recall its ambassador from Serbia. After receiving a telegram of support from Russia, Serbia mobilized its army and responded to the letter: it completely accepted point #8, which demanded an end to the smuggling of weapons and punishment of the frontier officers who had assisted the assassins, and completely accepted point #10, which demanded Serbia report the execution of the required measures as they were completed. Serbia partially accepted, finessed, disingenuously answered or politely rejected elements of the preamble and enumerated demands #1–7 and #9. The shortcomings of Serbia's response were published by Austria-Hungary; Austria-Hungary responded by breaking diplomatic relations. According to a 2021 study, Franz Ferdinand's absence was key to the breakdown of diplomacy and escalation into war, as Ferdinand had been the most powerful and effective proponent for peace in Vienna.

The next day, Serbian reservists being transported on tramp steamers on the Danube crossed onto the Austro-Hungarian side of the river at Temes-Kubin; Austro-Hungarian soldiers fired into the air to warn them off. The report of this incident was initially reported to Emperor Franz-Joseph erroneously as "a substantial skirmish". Austria-Hungary then declared war and mobilized the portion of its army that would face the (already mobilized) Serbian Army on 28 July 1914. Under the Secret Treaty of 1892, Russia and France were obliged to mobilize their armies if any of the Triple Alliance mobilized. Russia partially mobilized along its Austrian border on 29 July, and on 30 July Russia ordered general mobilization. Russia's general mobilization set off full Austro-Hungarian and German mobilizations. Soon all the Great Powers except Italy had chosen sides and gone to war.

== Legacy ==
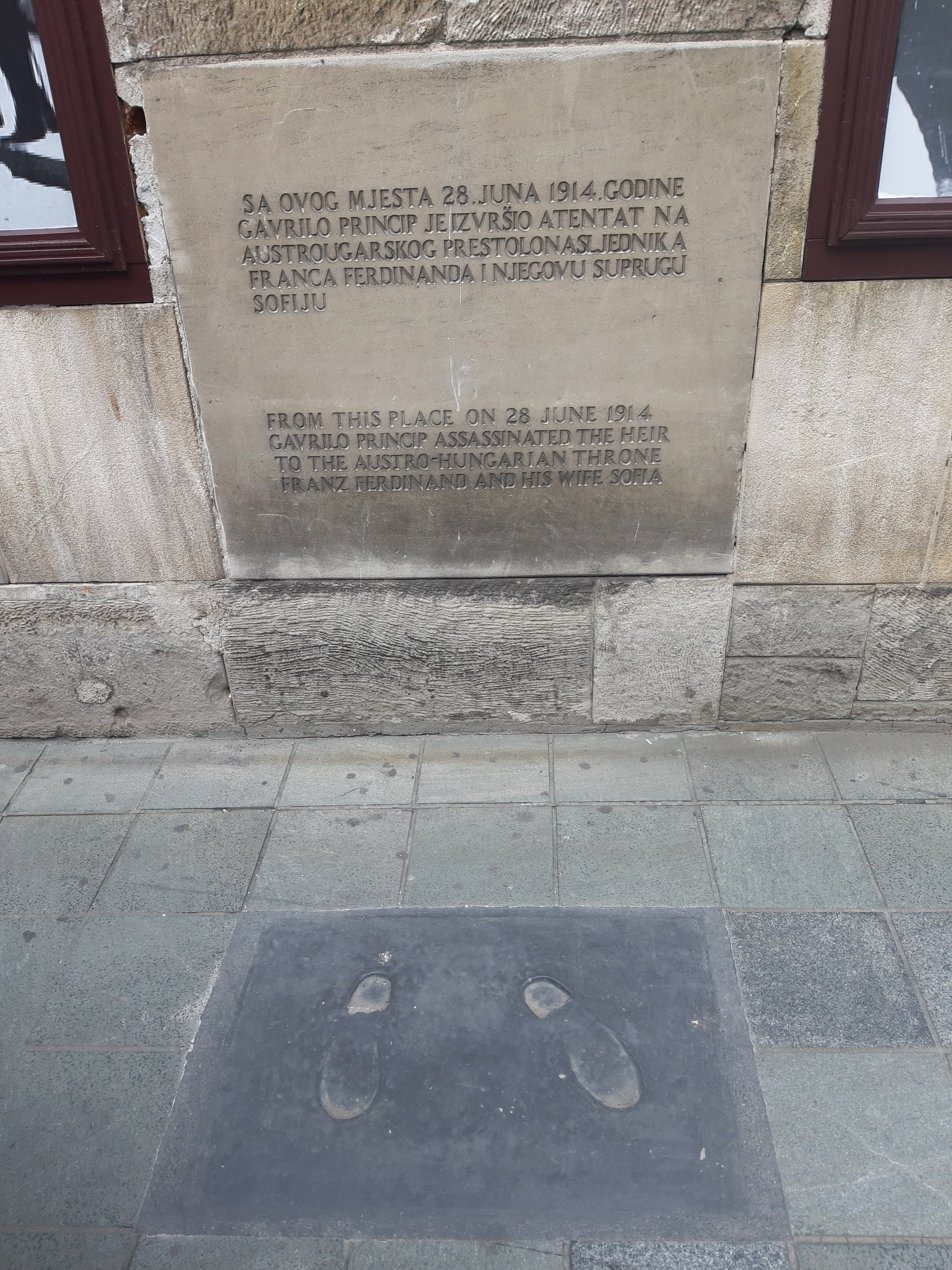
The site of the assassination is marked by a small plaque, written in both Serbo-Croatian and English, together with Gavrilo Princip footprints.

The consequences of his action were very bad for Bosnia. Bosnia ceased to exist in Yugoslavia, and Bosnian Muslims were not recognised until 1968. They [Austria-Hungary] were still much better rulers than the Kingdom of Yugoslavia or communist Yugoslavia. You can look at the historical records and see how Austria-Hungary cared about issues like the rule of law. We lost so much in 1918.

— Fedzad Forto, editor of a Bosniak-Croat news agency, responding to claims that Princip helped liberate Bosnia and that Austria-Hungary was an occupying power.

The shots fired 100 years ago by Gavrilo Princip were not fired at Europe, they were shots for freedom, marking the start of the Serbs' fight for liberation from foreign occupiers.

— Milorad Dodik, Bosnian Serb politician and president of Republika Srpska.

Later, referring to Franz Ferdinand's assassination, Vaso Čubrilović said: "We destroyed a beautiful world that was lost forever due to the war that followed."

Following the breakup of Yugoslavia, Princip's legacy came under reevaluation in the various successor states. In Bosnia and Herzegovina, Bosniaks and Croats largely view Gavrilo Princip as a terrorist and an ethnic Serb nationalist. Many Serbs consider Princip a national hero. The 100th anniversary of the assassination was commemorated with a concert by the Vienna Philharmonic in the Sarajevo City Hall, in an event that was organized by the European Union. Austrian president Heinz Fischer was the guest of honour. The World War I commemorations were boycotted by Serb nationalists and dignitaries, who, along with Bosnian Serbs, view "Princip as a hero." On the 100th anniversary of the assassination, a statue of Gavrilo Princip was erected in East Sarajevo. This was followed by another statue in Belgrade, which was erected in June 2015. Serbian history textbooks deny that Serbia or Princip were responsible for starting World War I, laying blame on the Central Powers instead. Milorad Dodik acknowledged that Bosnia is "still divided", but maintained that Princip was a "freedom fighter" and that Austria-Hungary had been an "occupier".

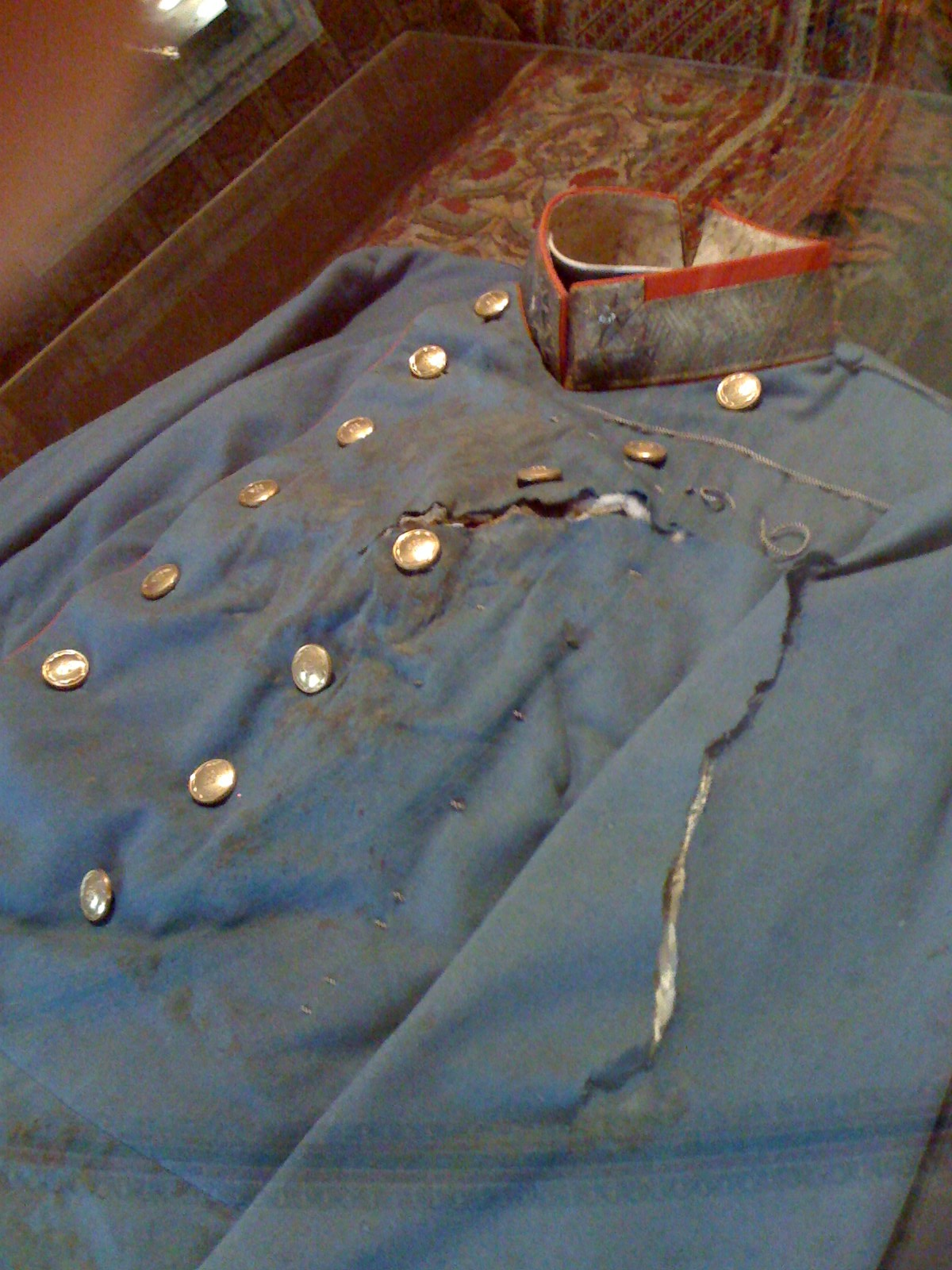
Uniform worn by Ferdinand when he was assassinated (Museum of Military History, Vienna)

Princip's weapon, along with the car in which the Archduke was riding, his bloodstained uniform and the chaise longue on which he died, are on permanent display in the Heeresgeschichtliches Museum in Vienna, Austria. The bullet fired by Gavrilo Princip, sometimes referred to as "the bullet that started World War I", is a museum exhibit in the Konopiště Castle near the town of Benešov in the Czech Republic. The bronze medallion of Ferdinand and Sophie, which was part of a monument that was erected on the site of the assassination and demolished in 1918 during Yugoslav rule, is currently preserved in the National Gallery of Bosnia and Herzegovina in Sarajevo. A marble plaque commemorating Princip and the assassination was erected in 1930 but, following the 1941 German invasion of Yugoslavia, it was removed by German troops and Volksdeutsche and was subsequently given to Adolf Hitler as a 52nd birthday present. Hitler sent it to the Berlin Zeughaus where it was put on display in the military museum until 1945 when it disappeared.

== In art and culture ==
=== Literature ===
- The Bridge on the Drina (1945) by Ivo Andrić (Nobel Prize laureate)
- The Guns of August (1963) by Barbara W. Tuchman (Pulitzer Prize for General Nonfiction)
- June 28, 1914 (2019) by Zlatko Topčić

=== Theater ===
- This Grave Is Too Small for Me (2013) written by Biljana Srbljanović

=== Film ===
- 1914 (1931) directed by Richard Oswald
- Sarajevo (1940) directed by Max Ophüls
- Sarajevo (1940) directed by Ákos Ráthonyi
- Sarajevo (1955) directed by Fritz Kortner
- The Day That Shook the World (1975) directed by Veljko Bulajić
- St. George Shoots the Dragon (2009) directed by Srđan Dragojević
- Sarajevo (2014) directed by Andreas Prochaska
- The Man Who Defended Gavrilo Princip (2014) directed by Srđan Koljević
- The King's Man directed by Matthew Vaughn

=== TV series ===
- The Great War (1964) written by John Terraine and Correlli Barnett
- Fall of Eagles (1974) created by John Elliot
- 37 Days (2014) directed by Justin Hardy

== General and cited references ==
- Albertini, Luigi (1953). Origins of the War of 1914. Vol. II. Oxford: Oxford University Press. OCLC 168712.
- Albertini, Luigi (2005). Origins of the War of 1914. Vol. I. New York: Enigma Books. ISBN 1929631316.
- Belfield, Richard (2005). The Assassination Business: A History of State-Sponsored Murder. New York: Carroll & Graf. ISBN 0786713437.
- Biagini, Antonello; Motta, Giovanna (2015). The First World War: Analysis and Interpretation, Volume 1. Cambridge Scholars Publishing. ISBN 978-1443881869.
- Blakley, Patrick R. F. (May 2009). "Narodna Odbrana (The Black Hand): Terrorist Faction that Divided the World" (PDF). Oswego Historical Review (2): 13–34. Archived from the original (PDF) on 15 June 2007.
- Butcher, Tim (2014). The Trigger: Hunting the Assassin Who Brought the World to War. New York: Grove Press. ISBN 978-0802191885.
- Buttar, Prit (2016). Collision of Empires. Osprey Publishing. ISBN 978-1782006480.
- Clark, Christopher (2012). The Sleepwalkers: How Europe Went to War in 1914. Penguin UK. ISBN 978-0718192952.
- Craig, John S. (2005). Peculiar Liaisons: In War, Espionage, and Terrorism in the Twentieth Century. Algora Publishing. ISBN 0875863310.
- De Schelking, Eugene (1918). Recollections of a Russian Diplomat, The Suicide of Monarchies. New York: Macmillan Co. OCLC 1890657.
- Dedijer, Vladimir (1966). The Road to Sarajevo. New York: Simon and Schuster. OCLC 400010.
- Dierauer, Isabelle (2013). Disequilibrium, Polarization, and Crisis Model: An International Relations Theory Explaining Conflict. University Press of America. ISBN 978-0761861065.
- Donia, Robert J. (2006). Sarajevo: A Biography. University of Michigan Press. ISBN 978-0472115570.
- Duijzings, Gerlachlus (2000). Religion and the Politics of Identity in Kosovo. C. Hurst & Co. Publishers. ISBN 978-1850653929.
- Gerolymatos, Andre (2008). The Balkan Wars. Hachette UK. ISBN 978-0786724574.
- Gioseffi, Daniela (1993). On Prejudice: A Global Perspective. Anchor Books. ISBN 978-0385469388.
- Greenawalt, Alexander (2001). "Kosovo Myths: Karadžić, Njegoš, and the Transformation of Serb Memory" (PDF). Spaces of Identity. 3: 49–65.
- Humphreys, Brendan (2013). The Battle Backwards A Comparative Study of the Battle of Kosovo Polje (1389) and the Munich Agreement (1938) as Political Myths (PhD). University of Helsinki. ISBN 978-9521090851.
- Johnson, Wes (2007). Balkan Inferno: Betrayal, War and Intervention, 1990–2005. Enigma Books. ISBN 978-1929631636.
- Joll, James; Martel, Gordon (2013). The Origins of the First World War (3rd ed.). Routledge. ISBN 978-1317875369.
- King, Greg; Woolmans, Sue (2013). The Assassination of the Archduke: Sarajevo 1914 and the Romance That Changed the World. St. Martin's Press. ISBN 978-1250038678.
- MacKenzie, David (1989). Apis, the Congenial Conspirator: the Life of Colonel Dragutin T. Dimitrijević. East European Monographs. ISBN 0880331623.
- MacKenzie, David (1995). Black Hand on Trial: Salonika 1917. Eastern European Monographs. ISBN 978-0880333207.
- Levy, Jack S.; Mulligan, William (3 June 2021). "Why 1914 but Not Before? A Comparative Study of the July Crisis and Its Precursors". Security Studies. 30 (2): 213–244. doi:10.1080/09636412.2021.1915584. ISSN 0963-6412. S2CID 236269759.
- MacMillan, Margaret (2013). The War That Ended Peace: How Europe Abandoned Peace for the First World War. Profile Books. ISBN 978-1847654168.
- Magrini, Luciano (1929). Il Dramma Di Seraievo. Origini e responsabilita della guerra europea. Milan. OCLC 8018932.
- Martel, Gordon (2014). The Month that Changed the World: July 1914 and WWI. Oxford University Press. ISBN 978-0191643279.
- McMeekin, Sean (2013). 7/1/1914: Countdown to War. Basic Books. ISBN 978-0465031450.
- Mitrović, Andrej (2007). Serbia's Great War, 1914–1918. Purdue University Press. ISBN 978-1557534774.
- National World War I Museum and Memorial (2025). "Belgian Automatic Pistol". United States Congress.
- Newman, John Paul (25 June 2015). Yugoslavia in the Shadow of War: Veterans and the Limits of State Building, 1903–1945. Cambridge University Press. ISBN 978-1-107-07076-9.
- Owings, W. A. Dolph. (1984). The Sarajevo Trial. Chapel Hill, NC: Documentary Publications. ISBN 0897121228.
- Palmer, Alan (1994). Twilight of the Habsburgs: the Life and Times of Emperor Francis Joseph. Atlantic Monthly Press. ISBN 978-1857998696.
- Pearson, Owen (2005). Albania in the Twentieth Century, A History: Volume I: Albania and King Zog, 1908–39. I.B.Tauris. ISBN 978-1845110130.
- Prohić, Kasim; Balić, Sulejman (1976). Sarajevo. Tourist Association. OCLC 442656793.
- Rauchensteiner, Manfried (2014). The First World War and the End of the Habsburg Monarchy, 1914–1918. Vienna: Böhlau Verlag. ISBN 978-3205795889.
- Remak, Joachim (1959). Sarajevo: the story of a political murder. New York: Criterion Books. LCCN 59-6557.
- Remak, Joachim (1971). The First World War: Causes, Conduct, Consequences. Wiley. ISBN 0471716340.
- Russell, G. (2014). The Emperors: How Europe's Rulers Were Destroyed by the First World War. Amberley Publishing. ISBN 978-1445634395.
- Sageman, M. (2017). Turning to Political Violence: The Emergence of Terrorism. University of Pennsylvania Press, Inc. ISBN 978-0812248777.
- Simpson, John (2010). Unreliable Sources: How the Twentieth Century Was Reported. Pan Macmillan. ISBN 978-0230750104.
- Sugar, Peter F. (1999). East European Nationalism, Politics and Religion. Farnham, England: Ashgate Publishing. ISBN 978-0860788065.
- Taylor, A. J. P. (1963). The First World War: An Illustrated History. London: Penguin Books. ISBN 0140024816.
- Treadway, J.D. (1998). The Falcon and the Eagle: Montenegro and Austria-Hungary, 1908–1914. Central European Studies. Purdue University Press. ISBN 978-1557531469.
- Trydar-Burzinski, Louis (1926). Le Crépuscule d'une Autocratie. Florence. OCLC 473403651.
- Tuchman, Barbara (2009). The Guns of August: The Outbreak of World War I. Random House Publishing Group. ISBN 978-0307567628.
- Willmott, H. P. (2003). World War I. Dorling Kindersley. ISBN 978-0789496270.
