= Cvjetko Popović =

Bosnian conspirator

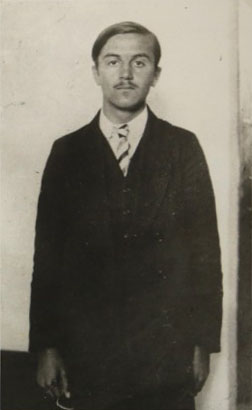
- Cvjetko Popović during the Sarajevo trial, October 1914
- Born: 1896; Prnjavor, Bosnia and Herzegovina, Austria-Hungary
- Died: 9 June 1980 (aged 83–84); Sarajevo, SR Bosnia and Herzegovina, SFR Yugoslavia

Cvjetko Popović (Serbian Cyrillic: Цвјетко Поповић; 1896 – 9 June 1980) was a Bosnian Serb who was involved in the 1914 assassination of Archduke Franz Ferdinand of Austria.

== Early life and assassination ==
He was born in what is modern-day Bosnia and Herzegovina. He was an 18-year-old student, studying in Sarajevo when Danilo Ilić recruited him and his friend, Vaso Čubrilović, to help assassinate Archduke Franz Ferdinand.

Nikola Pašić, the prime minister of the Kingdom of Serbia, heard about the plot and gave instructions for the three men to be arrested. However, his orders were not implemented and the three men arrived in Bosnia and Herzegovina where they joined forces with fellow conspirators, Gavrilo Princip, Miško Jovanović and Vaso's brother Veljko Čubrilović.

On Sunday 28 June 1914, Franz Ferdinand and Sophie von Chotek were assassinated by Gavrilo Princip. Princip and Nedeljko Čabrinović were captured and interrogated by the police. They eventually gave the names of their fellow conspirators. Muhamed Mehmedbašić managed to escape to Serbia but Popović, Ilić, Jovanović, and the Čubrilović brothers were arrested and charged with treason and murder.

All the men were found guilty. Under Austro-Hungarian law, an offender under the age of 20 could not be executed. Nedjelko Čabrinović, Gavrilo Princip and Trifko Grabež therefore received the maximum penalty of twenty years, whereas Vaso Čubrilović were sentenced to 16 years and Popović to 13 years in prison at Terezín.

Popović was released when the Allies defeated the Central Powers in November 1918, having served four years of his 13-year sentence.

== Later life ==
After his release from prison at the end of World War I, Popović returned to teaching as a professor of philosophy and eventually became Curator of the Ethnographic Department of the Sarajevo Museum.

The night before the 50th anniversary of the killing of the Archduke in 1964, Popović attended a lecture about the assassination in Sarajevo, but did not attend any of the events throughout the city, commemorating the anniversary. He was quoted as saying that he would not have taken part in the assassination had he known it would lead to war.

Marking the 55th anniversary of the event in June 1969, Popović, then aged 73, gave an interview recalling the assassination.

Cvjetko Popović died in Sarajevo on 9 June 1980 at the age of 84, leaving Vaso Čubrilović as the sole surviving assassin. Čubrilović died 10 years and two days later on 11 June 1990 at age 93.

== Sources ==
- Mitrović, A. (2007). Serbia's Great War, 1914-1918. Central European studies. Purdue University Press. ISBN 978-1-55753-476-7.
- Elsie, Robert (2010). Historical Dictionary of Kosovo. Lanham, Maryland: Rowman & Littlefield. ISBN 978-0-8108-7483-1.
