= Ljubomir Vulović =

Serbian army officier (1876–1917)

Ljuba Vulović
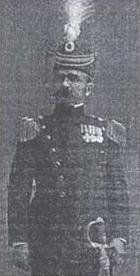
- Born: Ljubomir R. Vulović
- Burial place: Zeitenlik
- Relatives: Aleksa Vulović
- Military career
- Allegiance: Kingdom of Serbia
- Rank: artillery major
- Nickname: Ljuba

Ljubomir Vulović (Serbian Cyrillic: Љубомир Вуловић, 6 January 1876 – 26 June 1917), known by his nickname Ljuba (Љуба), was an artillery major in the Serbian Army, conspirator of the May Coup, and member of the Black Hand.

== Life ==
Ljubomir R. Vulović (Љубомир Р. Вуловић) was born in Vukosavci, in the Kragujevac okrug of the Principality of Serbia. He finished three years of gymnasium and the artillery NCO school. He was given the rank of lieutenant on 21 March 1898, then elevated to major on 14 March 1899.

He was a founding member of the Central Board of Vranje, of the Serbian Chetnik Organization, alongside Ljuba Čupa, V. Karić, S. Zlatičanin, Jovan Nenadović, Dragiša Đurić, Petar Pešić, and others.

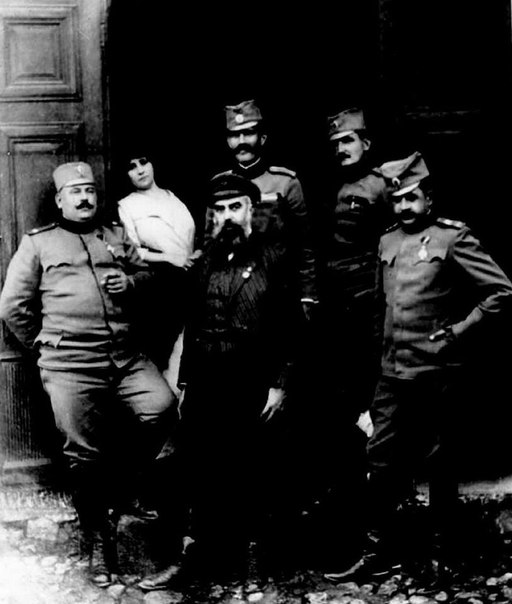
Salonika Trial, after verdict. Vulović to the right.

Nikola Pašić decided to get rid of the most prominent members of the Black Hand movement, by then officially disbanded. Dimitrijević and several of his military colleagues were arrested and tried on false charges of the attempted assassination of Regent Alexander I Karađorđević. On 23 May 1917, following the so-called Salonika Trial, Colonel Dragutin Dimitrijević, Major Ljubomir Vulović and Rade Malobabić were found guilty of treason and sentenced to death. A month later, on 23 June they were executed by firing squad. After World War II, Apis and his associates were rehabilitated. All three men are buried at the Serbian Military Graveyard in the Zeitenlik Allied military cemetery in the same city.

He was married and had a child.

== Awards ==
- Order of St. Sava.

== See also ==
- List of Chetnik voivodes

== Sources ==
- Trbić, Vasilije (1996). Memoari: 1898-1912 (in Serbian). Kultura. ISBN 9788678010132.
- Daily Dose of Boy Boy (August 11, 2024). "Political Assassination Tier List!! | Boy Boy Play". YouTube.
