= Trifko Grabež =

Member of the Serbian Black Hand

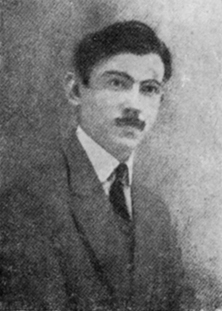
- Grabež, c. 1910
- Born: 28 June [O.S. 16 June] 1895; Pale, Bosnia and Herzegovina, Austria-Hungary
- Died: 21 October 1916 (aged 21); Theresienstadt, Austria-Hungary
- Resting place: Vidovdan Heroes Chapel, Sarajevo

Trifun "Trifko" Grabež (Serbian Cyrillic: Трифун Трифко Грабеж; 28 June [O.S. 16 June] 1895 – 21 October 1916) was a Bosnian Serb member of the Black Hand organization which was involved in the assassination of Archduke Franz Ferdinand.

== Early life ==
Trifko Grabež was born on 28 June [O.S. 16 June] 1895 in Pale, a small town in eastern Bosnia and Herzegovina. His father Đorđe Grabež was a Serbian Orthodox priest. At the age of seventeen, Grabež was expelled from school for striking one of his teachers.

Grabež left home and moved to Belgrade, which was a part of the Kingdom of Serbia at the time where he became roommates with Gavrilo Princip. As well as continuing his education he joined the Black Hand secret society. For the next two years he spent most of his spare time with other nationalists who favoured a union between Bosnia and Herzegovina and Serbia.

== Black Hand ==
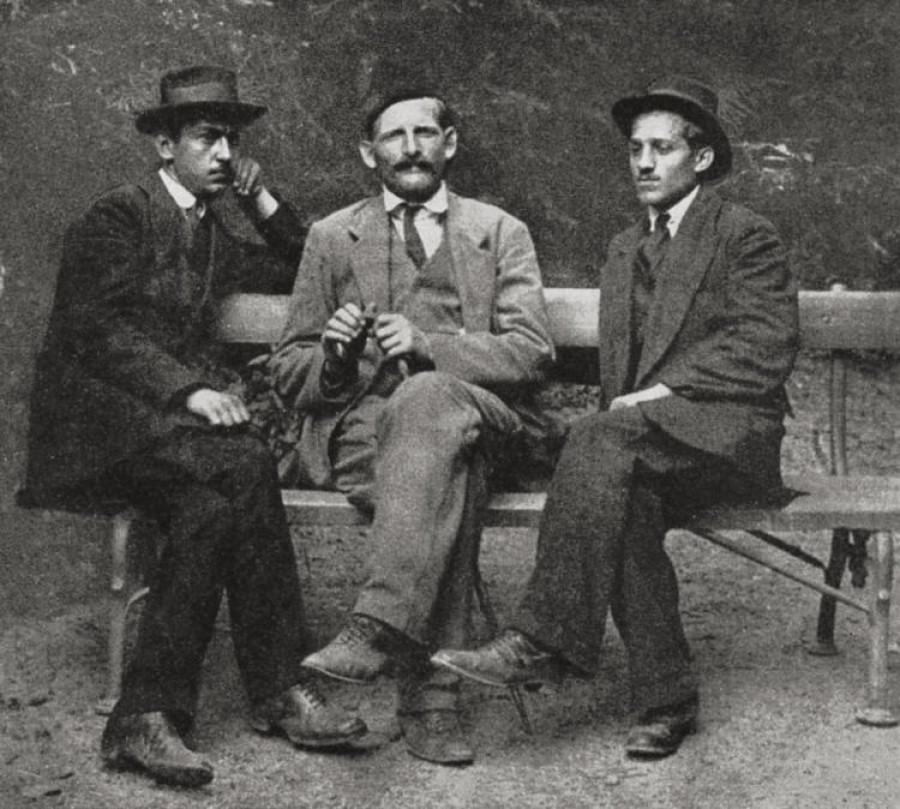
Grabež, Ciganović and Princip in Kalemegdan Park, Belgrade, May 1914.

When it was announced that Archduke Franz Ferdinand, the heir to the throne of Austro-Hungarian Empire, was going to visit Bosnia and Herzegovina in June 1914, Colonel Dragutin Dimitrijević, the chief of the Intelligence Department in the Serbian Army and head of the Black Hand, sent seven men, Grabež, Nedeljko Čabrinović, Vaso Čubrilović, Cvjetko Popović, Danilo Ilić, Muhamed Mehmedbašić and Gavrilo Princip to Sarajevo to assassinate him.

Each man was given either a revolver or a bomb and a small vial of cyanide. They were instructed to commit suicide after Archduke Franz Ferdinand had been killed.

Nikola Pašić, the prime minister of Serbia, heard about the plot and gave instructions for Grabež, Princip and Čabrinović to be arrested when they attempted to leave the country. However, his orders were not implemented and they managed to reach Bosnia and Herzegovina where they joined forces with fellow conspirators, Vaso and Veljko Čubrilović, Muhamed Mehmedbašić, Danilo Ilić and Cvijetko Popović.

== Sarajevo assassination ==
On Sunday, 28 June 1914, Franz Ferdinand and Sophie Duchess of Hohenberg arrived in Sarajevo by train. General Oskar Potiorek, Governor of the Austrian provinces of Bosnia and Herzegovina, was waiting to take the royal party to the City Hall for the official reception.

In the front car was Fehim Čurčić, the Mayor of Sarajevo and Dr. Gerde, the city's Commissioner of Police. Franz Ferdinand and Sophie Chotek von Chotkova were in the second car with Oskar Potiorek and Count von Harrach. The cars' top was rolled back in order to allow the crowds a good view of its occupants. The seven members of the Black Hand group also lined the route. They were spaced out along the Appel Quay, each one had been instructed to try to kill Franz Ferdinand when the royal car reached his position. The first conspirator on the route to see the royal car was Muhamed Mehmedbašić. Standing by the Austro-Hungarian Bank, Mehmedbašić allowed the car to pass and failed to take action. Mehmedbašić later said that a policeman was standing behind him and feared he would be arrested before he had a chance to throw his bomb.

Nedjeljko Čabrinović, the next man on the route, hurled his hand grenade at the archduke's car. The driver accelerated when he saw the object flying towards him and the grenade exploded under the wheel of the next car. Two of the occupants, Eric von Merizzi and Count Boos-Waldeck were seriously wounded. A number of spectators were also hit by bomb shrapnel.

Later that day, Gavrilo Princip managed to kill both Archduke Franz Ferdinand and his wife Sophie, Duchess of Hohenberg. Princip and Nedjeljko Čabrinović were interrogated by the police. They kept to the promise to not tell anyone. Muhamed Mehmedbašić managed to escape to Serbia but Grabež, Popović and the Čubrilović were arrested after Danilo Ilić confessed to the police. The police went round and investigated random people in order to identify potential accomplices. Once they spoke to Ilić, he lost his nerve and told about the assassins.

All seven of the men charged with treason and the murder of Archduke Franz Ferdinand were convicted. Under Austro-Hungarian law, capital punishment could not be imposed on someone who was under the age of 20 when they had committed the crime. Grabež and most of the others therefore received the maximum penalty of twenty years in prison.

== Death ==
Grabež died in prison of tuberculosis on 21 October 1916, aged 21.

== Literature ==
- Blakley, Patrick R. F. (2009). "Narodna Odbrana (The Black Hand): Terrorist Faction that Divided the World" (PDF). Oswego Historical Review. 2: 13–34.
- Clark, Christopher (2013). The Sleepwalkers: How Europe Went to War in 1914. Harper Collins. ISBN 9780062199225.
- Fabijančić, Tony (2010). Bosnia: In the Footsteps of Gavrilo Princip. Edmonton: University of Alberta. ISBN 978-0-88864-519-7.
- Mitrović, Andrej (2007). Serbia's Great War, 1914–1918. West Lafayette, Indiana: Purdue University Press. ISBN 978-1-55753-477-4.
