= Luigi Albertini =

Italian politician (1871–1941)

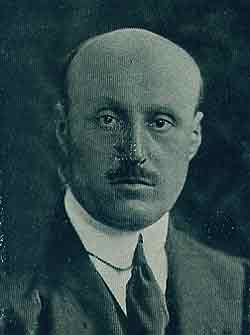
- Born: 19 October 1871; Ancona, Kingdom of Italy
- Died: 29 December 1941 (aged 70); Rome, Kingdom of Italy
- Education: University of Turin

Luigi Albertini (19 October 1871 – 29 December 1941) was an influential Italian newspaper editor, member of the Italian Parliament, and historian of the First World War. As editor of one of Italy's best-known newspapers, Corriere della Sera of Milan, he was a champion of liberalism. He was a vigorous opponent of socialism and clericalism, and of Giovanni Giolitti who was willing to compromise with those forces during his time as prime minister of Italy. Albertini's opposition to the Italian fascist regime forced the owners to fire him in 1925.

Albertini was an outspoken anti-fascist even though at one time, he had supported the National Fascist Party for opposing the Left. From 1914 to Benito Mussolini's March on Rome in 1922, he was a member of Parliament in the Italian Senate, where he was a key intellectual and moderating force.

== Life ==
Albertini was born in Ancona on 19 October 1871. After reading law at the University of Turin, he moved to London in 1894 where he was a foreign correspondent for La Stampa of Turin. While in London, he investigated labour conditions and studied the organization of The Times newspaper. In 1898, he joined the Milan newspaper Corriere della Sera as an editorial assistant and worked under Eugenio Torelli Viollier and then Domenico Oliva. In the spring of 1900, Viollier died, and Albertini took his position as managing editor and, a few weeks later, director. He also invested in the paper. He installed modern equipment and updated the paper's technical services. Under Albertini's direction, Corriere della Sera became the most widely read and respected daily paper in Italy. In November 1925, the paper's owners, the Crespi family, sacked him because of his public stance against the fascist regime in Italy. His last editorial was included in the 29 November 1925 edition.

After that, Albertini withdrew from public life and retired to his model estate at Torre in Pietra, near Rome. There, he dedicated his time to managing the estate and reclaiming land on it. He also extensively researched Italy's role in the First and the Second World Wars. He wrote his memoirs, and had just completed his three-volume seminal work on the origins of the First World War when he died on 29 December 1941 in Rome.

== Legacy ==
Albertini's three-volume, titled The Origins of the War of 1914, was his highest achievement and brought him world fame. He researched and wrote it with the assistance of Luciano Magrini, a former Corriere della Sera foreign correspondent who was skilled in German. From 1928 to 1940, Magrini interviewed many of the protagonists of the First World War. He obtained numerous documents that are reproduced in the work, which was published in Italian in 1942 and 1943. It was translated into English by Isabella Massey and published by Oxford University Press in 1953.

The bedrock of all discussion remains L. Albertini's The Origins of the War of 1914… which provides a detailed chronology of the crisis and excerpts from the most important documents.

— John Keegan, author of The First World War

The first biography of Luigi Albertini was authored in 1945 by his brother Alberto, which was published in Italian in 1945. Since 1965, Ottavio Barié, formerly of the political science facility at Rome's Catholic University of the Sacred Heart, has had access to Albertini's huge correspondence, which he has edited and published. He also researched and wrote a second biography, Luigi Albertini, which was published in Italian in 1972.
