= Rade Malobabić =

Serbian spy

Rade Malobabić (Serbian Cyrillic: Раде Малобабић; died June 26, 1917) was a Serbian intelligence agent. He was best known for allegedly helping the Black Hand in the assassination of Archduke Franz Ferdinand, which initiated World War I.

== Agram (Zagreb) Trials ==
Rade Malobabić was one of the high-profile members of the 53 defendants tried for High Treason in Zagreb between 1907 and 1909. Rade was among 31 found guilty and sentenced to hard labour for an extended term. The subsequent appeal being successful and the parallel Friedjung Process proving the evidence against Malobabić and his fellow defendants to have been fabricated led to the state dropping the charges and releasing all 31 remaining accused in 1910.

== Military career ==
Malobabić was a Serbian military intelligence operative who was stationed in Austria and Bosnia-Herzegovina leading up to World War I. He also worked with the Serbian deliberation group, the Black Hand, which was the group that was responsible for assassinating Archduke Franz Ferdinand.

== Assassination of the Archduke ==
According to the final confession of Colonel Apis (which was extracted under torture and deception) Malobabić was hired by Apis to organize the assassination of the Archduke, and perform tasks such as smuggling weapons and providing information to other operatives that were a part of the killing mission. He is noteworthy as the only person accused of specific involvement in the assassinations of June 28, 1914, not to have been named by a single defendant nor by any of the counsel in the Sarajevo trial - indeed the only individual to ever link Malobabić to the murders is Apis and only then in his third and final statement on the matter 11 April 1917. In 1916 Malobabić broke after being tortured and accused Apis of plotting the whole scheme to assassinate Prince Alexander - he never admitted any involvement in Sarajevo.

== Death ==
Apis had adopted Malobabić as his aide most probably in light of the suffering the man had incurred following his incarceration from 1907 to 1910. However, this association proved fatal for Malobabić who openly blamed Apis for his impending death as he stood awaiting execution.

In December 1916, a number of alleged members of the Black Hand Gang were arrested by the Serbian military court in exile in Salonika and tried for an alleged plot against Crown Prince Alexander of Serbia. It is commonly held that the trials were an attempt at appeasement of the Habsburg royal family and conducted in the hope that the Habsburgs would declare peace with Serbia. Malobabić was named as the primary assassin, while Apis and Mohamed Mehmedbašić were among the accused. Two days before the third anniversary of Archduke's assassination, on June 26, 1917, Malobabić, Vulović, and Apis were executed by firing squad. Mehmedbašić had his sentence commuted to life imprisonment. In 1953, the Serbian supreme court reviewed and repealed the judgement of the Salonika Trials and exonerated all those involved. All three men are buried at the Serbian Military Graveyard in the Zeitenlik Allied military cemetery.
