= Gavrilo Princip =

Assassin of Archduke Franz Ferdinand (1894–1918)

- Гаврило Принцип
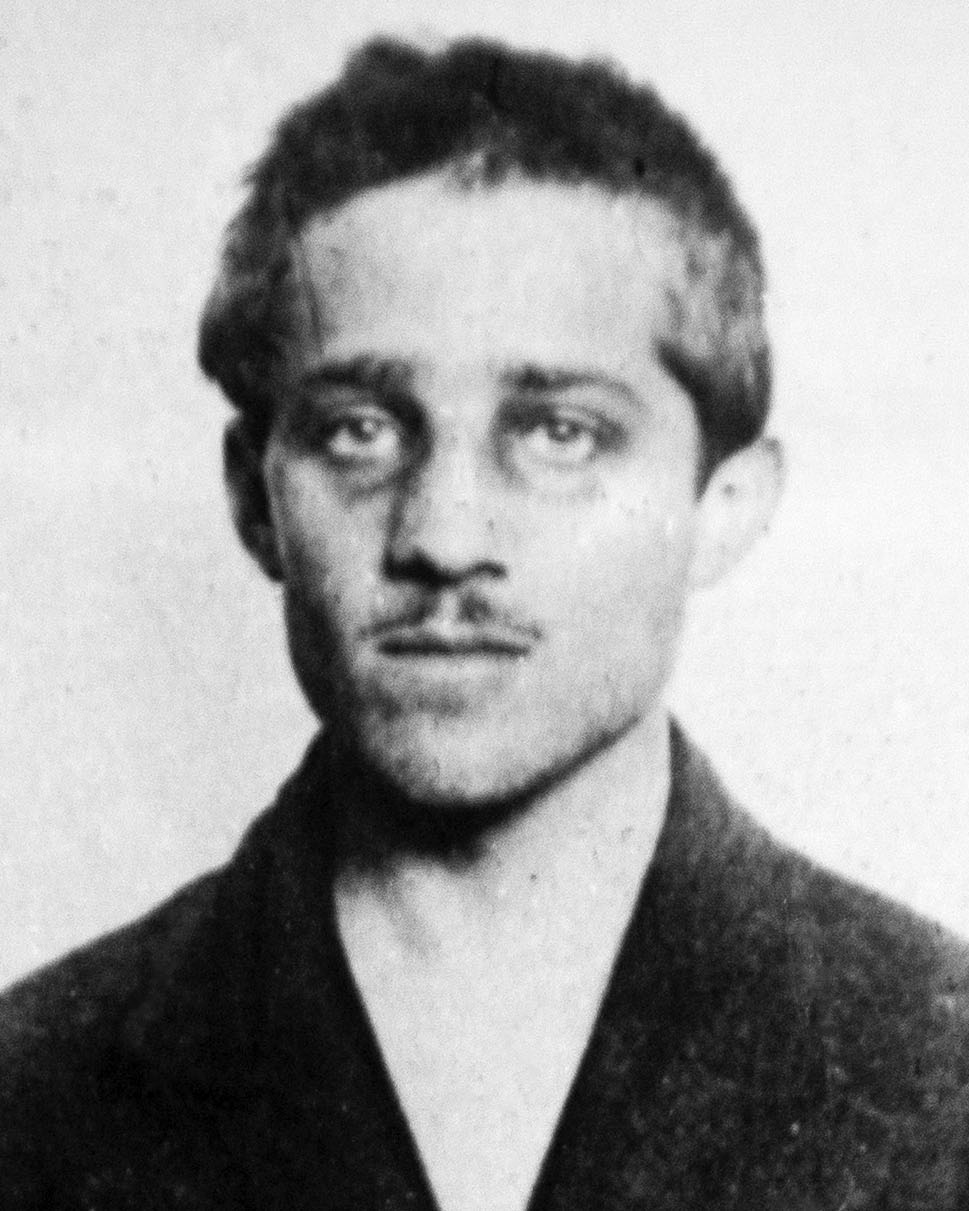
- Princip in his prison cell on 4 July 1914
- Born: 25 July 1894; Obljaj, Bosnia and Herzegovina, Austria-Hungary
- Died: 28 April 1918 (aged 23); Terezín, Bohemia, Austria-Hungary
- Resting place: Vidovdan Heroes Chapel, Sarajevo
- Occupation: Student
- Known for: Assassination of Archduke Franz Ferdinand and Sophie, Duchess of Hohenberg
- Motive: Yugoslav nationalism
- Convictions: High treason Murder (two counts)
- Penalty: 20 years' imprisonment
- Accomplices: Danilo Ilić, Trifko Grabež, Nedeljko Čabrinović, others

Details
- Killed: 2
- Date apprehended: 1914
- Imprisoned at: Terezín Fortress

Gavrilo Princip (Serbian Cyrillic: Гаврило Принцип, pronounced [ɡǎʋrilo prǐnt͡sip]; 25 July 1894 – 28 April 1918) was a Bosnian Serb student who assassinated Archduke Franz Ferdinand, heir presumptive to the throne of Austria-Hungary, and his wife Sophie, Duchess of Hohenberg, in Sarajevo on 28 June 1914. The assassination set off the July Crisis, a series of events that within one month led to the outbreak of World War I.

Princip was born in western Bosnia to a poor Serb family. Aged 13, he was sent to Sarajevo, the capital of Austrian-occupied Bosnia, to study at the Merchants' School. He later transferred to the gymnasium, where he became politically aware. In 1911, he joined Young Bosnia, a secret local society aiming to free Bosnia from Austrian rule and achieve the unification of the South Slavs. After attending anti-Austrian demonstrations in Sarajevo, he was expelled from school and walked to Belgrade, Serbia, to continue his education. During the First Balkan War, Princip traveled to Southern Serbia to volunteer with the Serbian army's irregular forces fighting against the Ottoman Empire but was rejected for being too small and weak.

In 1913, following the unexpected success of the Serbians in the war against the Ottomans, the Austrian military governor of Bosnia, Oskar Potiorek, declared a state of emergency, dissolved the parliament, imposed martial rule, and banned Serbian public, cultural, and educational societies. Inspired by assassination attempts against Imperial officials by Slavic nationalists and anarchists, Princip persuaded two other young Bosnians to join a plot to assassinate the heir to the Habsburg Empire during his announced visit to Sarajevo. The Black Hand, a Serbian secret society with ties to Serbian military intelligence, provided the conspirators with weapons and training before facilitating their re-entry into Bosnia.

On Sunday 28 June 1914, during the royal couple's visit to Sarajevo, the then-teenager Princip mortally wounded Franz Ferdinand and Sophie by firing a pistol into their open car. Princip was arrested immediately by Austro-Hungarian authorities and tried alongside 24 others, all Bosnians and thus Austro-Hungarian subjects. At his trial, Princip stated: "I am a Yugoslav nationalist, aiming for the unification of all Yugoslavs, and I do not care what form of state, but it must be free from Austria." Princip was spared the death penalty because of his age (19) and sentenced to twenty years in prison. He was imprisoned at the Terezín Fortress. The Serbian government itself did not inspire the assassination but the Austrian Foreign Office and Army used the murders as a reason for a preventive war which led directly to World War I.

Princip died on 28 April 1918 of tuberculosis, worsened by harsh prison conditions, that had already led to the amputation of his right arm. His legacy is viewed as controversial; many Serbs regard him as a hero who stood against colonial oppression and slavery, while Bosniaks and Croats frequently view him as a terrorist.

== Early life ==
Gavrilo Princip was born on 25 July [O.S. 13 July] 1894, in the remote hamlet of Obljaj, near Bosansko Grahovo, in western Bosnia. Bosnia was administered by Austria-Hungary, while still formally a province of the Ottoman Empire. He was the second of his parents' nine children, six of whom died in infancy. Princip's mother Marija wanted to name him after her late brother, Špiro, but he was named Gavrilo at the insistence of a local Eastern Orthodox priest, who claimed naming the sickly infant after the Archangel Gabriel would help him survive.

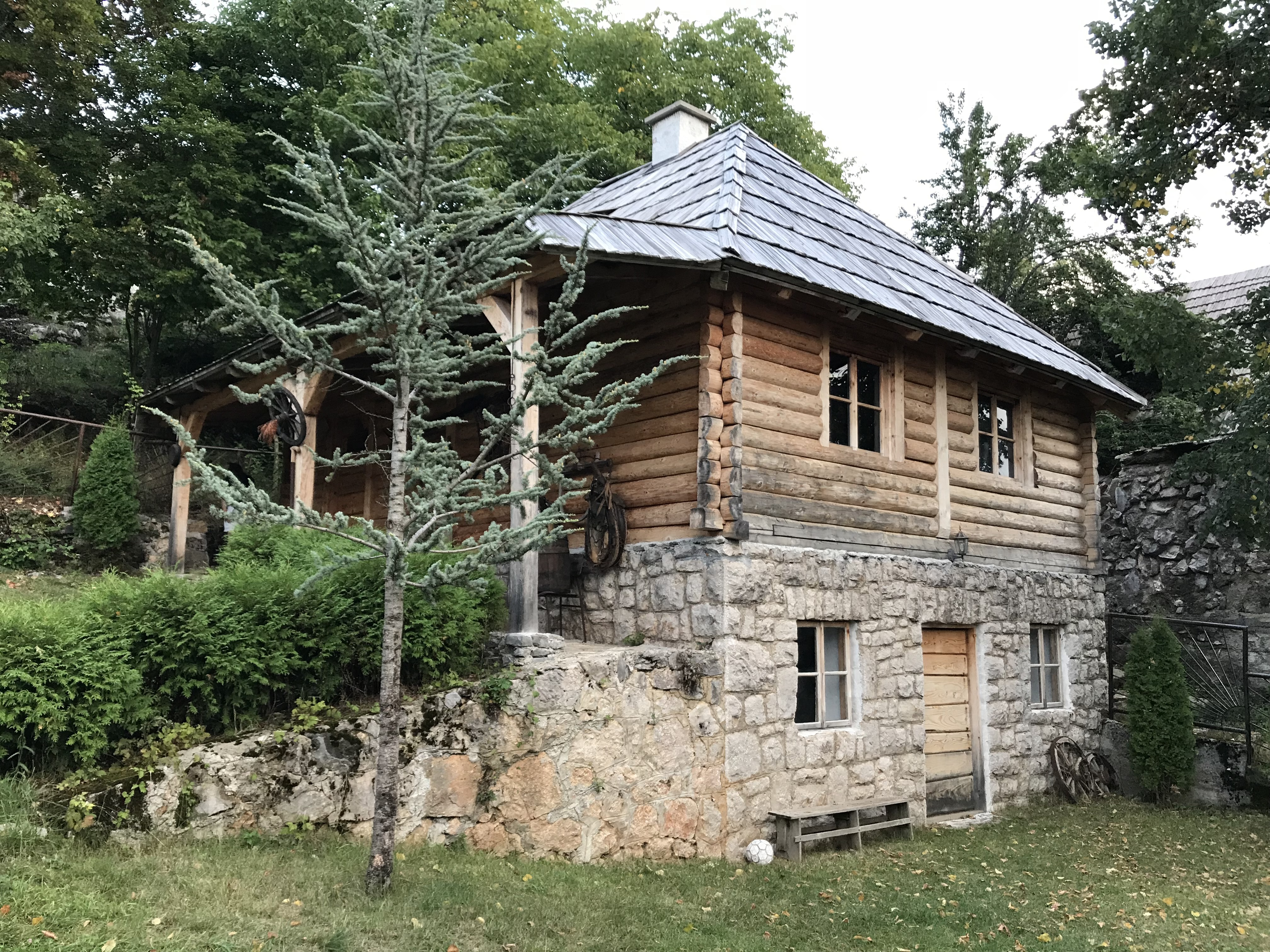
Princip family home in Obljaj

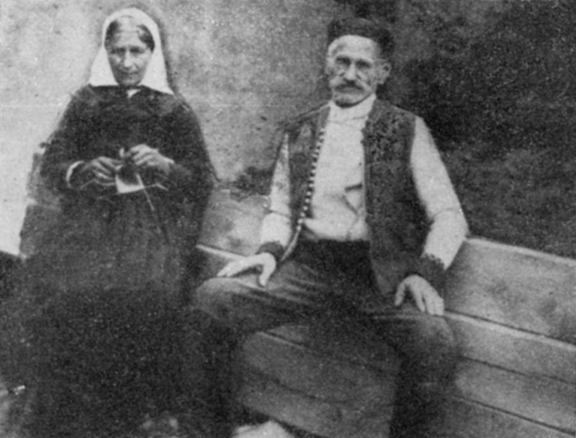
Gavrilo Princip's parents, Marija and Petar Princip c. 1927

A Serb family, the Princips had lived in northwestern Bosnia for centuries. Their ancestors came from Grahovo, Nikšić in Montenegro, emigrating in the early 1700s, they belonged to the Jovićević clan, and adhered to the Serbian Orthodox Christian faith. Princip's parents, Petar and Marija (née Mićić), were poor farmers who lived off the meagre land they owned. They were part of a class of Christian peasants known to the Ottomans as kmetovi (serfs), and were often oppressed by their Muslim landlords. Petar, who insisted on "strict correctness", never drank or swore and was mocked by his neighbours as a result. In his youth, he fought in the Herzegovina Uprising against the Ottomans. After the revolt, he resumed farming in the Grahovo valley, cultivating around 4 acres (1.6 ha; 0.0063 sq mi) of land and was forced to give a third of his income to his landlord. To supplement his income and sustain his family, he resorted to transporting mail and passengers across the mountains connecting northwestern Bosnia and Dalmatia.

Despite his father's initial objections, as he needed a shepherd to tend his sheep, Princip commenced primary school in 1903, at the age of nine. Despite facing challenges in his first year, he excelled in his studies, eventually receiving a collection of Serbian epic poetry from his headmaster in recognition of his academic success. At thirteen, Princip moved to Sarajevo, where his elder brother Jovan initially intended to enroll him at Sarajevo's Austro-Hungarian Military Academy. By the time Princip reached Sarajevo, Jovan had changed his mind following advice from a shopkeeper, who cautioned against sending his younger brother to become "an executioner of his own people." Instead, Princip was admitted to the Merchants' School, with Jovan financing his education through earnings from manual labor, such as transporting logs from the surrounding forests to mills in the city. After three years, Princip transferred to secondary school, the Sarajevo Gymnasium.

== Joining Young Bosnia ==
Following the annexation of the region by the Austro-Hungarian empire in 1908, Bosnia, like the other southern Slavic states under imperial rule, yearned for independence. As a result, various student groups emerged interested in movements such as romantic nationalism, nihilism, or anti imperialism. While at school and through his roommate Danilo Ilić, Princip was also exposed to socialist, anarchist, and communist writing. Princip started to associate with like-minded young nationalist revolutionaries and came to admire Bogdan Žerajić, a Bosnian Serb who had attempted to assassinate the Austro-Hungarian Governor of Bosnia and Herzegovina, before taking his own life. Žerajić, who was from Herzegovina like Princip, came to epitomize, in the eyes of many, the ideal of self sacrifice. On the anniversary of his death, Serb youths from Sarajevo started to visit his grave to lay flowers. According to Luigi Albertini, this is where, after spending nights reflecting at the grave, that Princip resolved to participate in his own attack. In 1911, Princip graduated from the fourth grade and joined Young Bosnia (Serbian: Mlada Bosna), a society with members from all three major Bosnian ethnic groups, that sought the liberation of Bosnia from Austro-Hungarian rule and the unification of all Southern Slavs in a common nation. Some believed that the newly independent Kingdom of Serbia, as the free part of the south Slavs, was obligated to help unify the southern Slavic peoples. Because the local authorities had forbidden students to form organisations and clubs, Princip and other members of Young Bosnia met in secret. During their meetings, they discussed literature, ethics and politics.

On 18 February 1912, Princip took part in a demonstration against the Habsburg authority in Sarajevo, organised by Luka Jukić, a Croat student from Bosnia. (Note: On 8 June 1912 Luka Jukić would attempt to assassinate the Governor of Croatia, Count Slavko Cuvaj, this would have a considerable influence on Princip.) The demonstrators burned a Hungarian flag and many were injured and arrested by the police. During the scuffle Princip was hit with a sabre and his clothes were torn. The following day the students declared a general strike, and for the first time in Bosnian history, Croats, Serbs and Muslims took part together. A student present that day claimed that "Princip went from class to class, threatening with his knuckle-duster all the boys who wavered in coming to the new demonstrations." As a result of his conduct and his involvement in the demonstrations against Austro-Hungarian authorities, Princip was expelled from school and in the spring of 1912 decided to go to Belgrade, making the 280-kilometre (170 mi) journey on foot. According to one account, he fell to his knees and kissed the ground upon crossing the border into Serbia. Having left Sarajevo without telling his brother, Princip lived without money and in difficult conditions alongside other Bosnian students. In June 1912, he went to the First Belgrade Gymnasium to take the fifth grade exam which he failed.

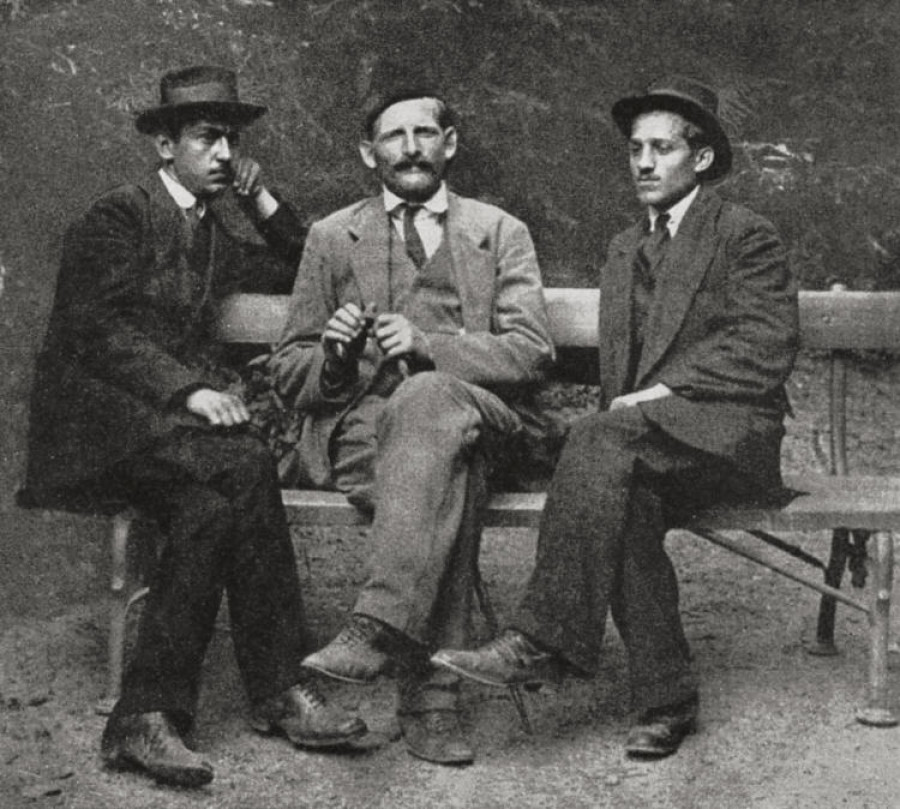
(left to right) Trifko Grabež, Milan Ciganović, and Gavrilo Princip in Kalemegdan Park, Belgrade, c. May 1914.

When war broke out between the Balkan states and Turkey in October 1912, Princip went to a recruitment office in Belgrade to volunteer his service with the komite, the irregular Serbian units. Upon being rejected because of his small build, he traveled to a different recruitment office this time in Prokuplje, north of the Turkish frontier in southern Serbia. After taking one look at him, Major Vojislav Tankosić, the commander of all Komite units, rejected him for being too small and looking too weak. Humiliated, Princip returned first briefly to Belgrade then back to the village of Hadžići. According to Vladimir Dedijer, his failure to be accepted in the army on the account that he looked weak, was one of the primary motives which pushed Princip to do something exceptionally brave. In the South Slav lands, the unexpected success of the Serbian army resulted in numerous celebrations and demonstrations of support. In reaction on 2 May 1913, while Princip was in Sarajevo, the Austro-Hungarian Governor of Bosnia and Herzegovina General Potiorek declared a state of emergency, suspended the 1910 constitution of Bosnia and Herzegovina, implemented martial law, seized control of all schools, and prohibited all Serb public, cultural, and educational societies.

In the summer of 1913 Princip passed the fifth and sixth grades of high school, then in early 1914 he left Sarajevo for Belgrade, stopping briefly in his village to see his parents. While in Belgrade preparing for his sixth-class examinations in the First Belgrade High School, Princip was shown by his friend Nedeljko Čabrinović a newspaper cutting announcing Archduke Franz Ferdinand of Austria's visit to Bosnia in June. Princip decided to lead a group of assassins back to Bosnia and attack the Archduke during his official visit to Sarajevo. He convinced Čabrinović and his old schoolfriend Trifko Grabež to join the plot. They also talked about killing Oskar Potiorek, the provincial governor, as a means of protest against the emergency régime. To find weapons, Princip asked his Bosnian Muslim friend, Djulaga Bukovac, a veteran of the Balkan wars. Bukovac introduced them to Milan Ciganović, another Bosnian expatriate who had fought under Major Tankosić during the Second Balkan War. Ciganović was also a freemason (Note: The fact that Ciganović was a freemason would later lead the Austro-Hungarian authorities to argue that the plot to kill the Archduke was also hatched by the Freemasons.) and an associate of the Black Hand, the secretive, ultra-nationalist Serbian group responsible for the regicide of 1903. Ciganović then approached Tankosić, another Black Hand member of Bosnian descent, from whom he obtained the weapons.

On 27 May 1914, Ciganović supplied the three young Bosnians with five Browning pistols, six grenades, and several vials of poison. Ciganović took the would-be assassins to Topčider forest, just outside the centre of Belgrade, training them on how to use the weapons. Princip proved to be the best marksman. The three-man assassination team left Belgrade on 28 May 1914, taking a river boat that took them to Šabac, they then split up crossing separately the border into Bosnia. Each of them was carrying two bombs tied around their waist as well as pistols, ammunition and a bottle of cyanide in their pockets. Before leaving Serbia, Princip wrote to his former roommate in Sarajevo Danilo Ilić, to notify him of his assassination plan and to ask him to recruit more people. Ilić recruited Muhamed Mehmedbašić, a Bosnian Muslim carpenter, Cvetko Popović, and Vaso Čubrilović, both Bosnian Serb students aged eighteen and seventeen.

== Assassination of Archduke Franz Ferdinand ==
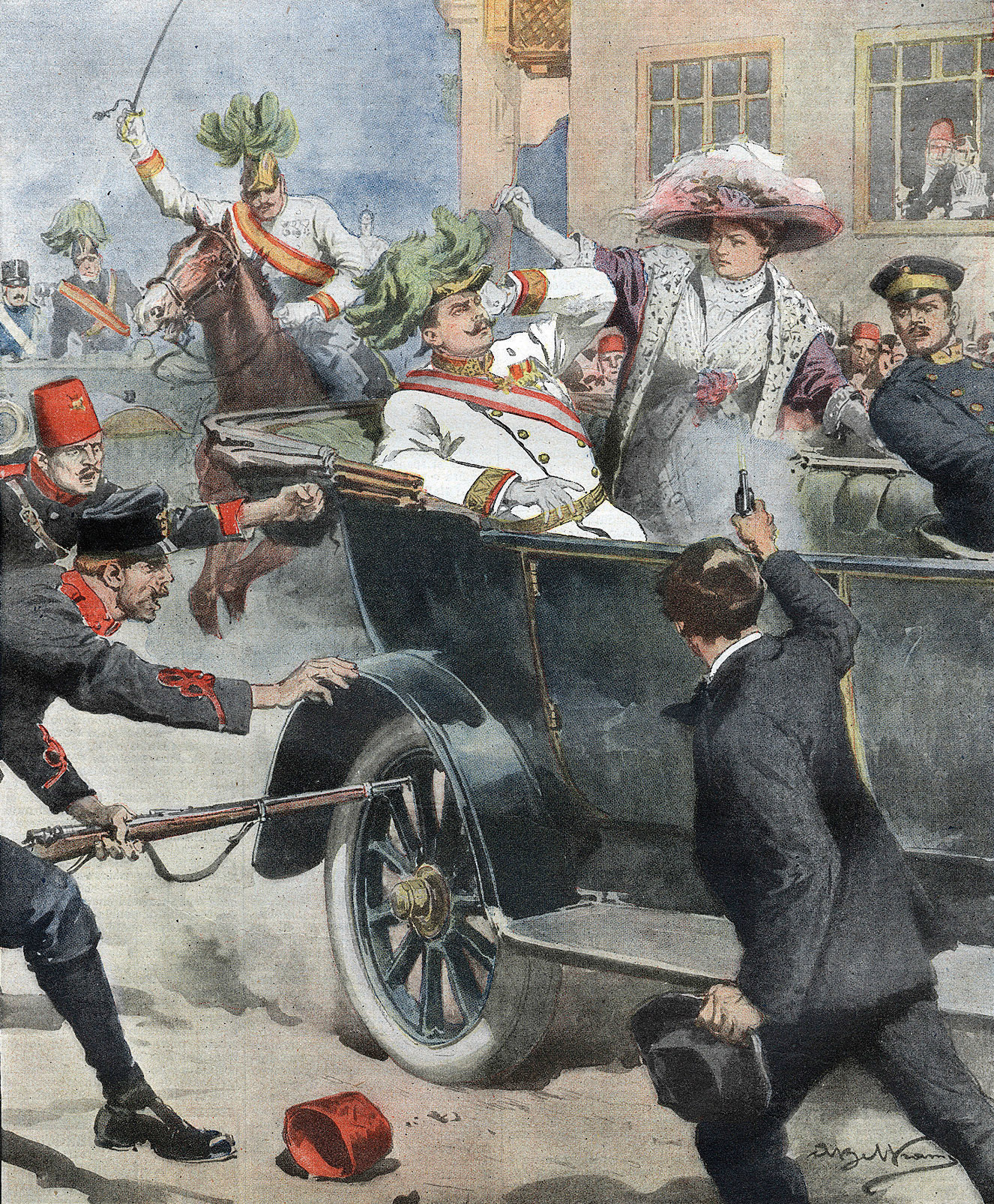
Princip fatally shooting the royal couple as illustrated by Achille Beltrame in La Domenica del Corriere

Archduke Franz Ferdinand of Austria and his wife, Duchess Sophie Chotek, arrived in Sarajevo by train shortly before 10 a.m. on 28 June 1914. Their car was the third in a six-car motorcade heading towards Sarajevo Town Hall.

Princip and five other conspirators were positioned along the route, spaced out along the Appel Quay, each instructed to assassinate the Archduke when the royal car reached their position. The first, Muhamed Mehmedbašić, stood near the Austro-Hungarian Bank but lost his nerve and allowed the car to pass without acting. At 10:15 am, as the motorcade passed the central police station, 19-year-old student Nedeljko Čabrinović hurled a grenade at the Archduke's car. The driver accelerated upon seeing the grenade, which had a 10-second delay, and the bomb exploded under the fourth car, seriously wounding two occupants. Following this failed attempt, the motorcade sped away, and the remaining conspirators, including Princip, were unable to act due to the speed of the vehicles.

After delivering his scheduled speech at the Town Hall, the Archduke decided to visit the victims of Čabrinović's grenade attack at the Sarajevo Hospital. To avoid the city centre, General Oskar Potiorek directed the royal car to travel straight along the Appel Quay to the hospital. However, Potiorek failed to inform the driver, Leopold Lojka, a Czech, about this change. On the way to the hospital, Lojka, following the original plan, turned onto a side street where Princip happened to be standing in front of a delicatessen. After Potiorek shouted at him to stop, Lojka halted the car and began reversing. As he did so, the engine stalled, and the gears locked. Princip stepped forward, drew an FN Model 1910 semi-automatic pistol, and fired twice at close range into the car. The first bullet struck the Archduke in the neck, while the second hit the Duchess in the abdomen. Both died shortly afterward.

On 13 July 1914, Austro-Hungarian official Friedrich Wiesner submitted a report concluding that there was no evidence to implicate the Serbian government in the conspiracy behind the assassination of Archduke Franz Ferdinand and his wife in Sarajevo. This assessment, communicated to Vienna, confirmed that the Serbian state had not been involved in the plot. Despite this, the Austro-Hungarian government, perceiving Serbia's nationalist ambitions as a direct threat to the stability of its multi-ethnic empire, seized upon the assassination as a pretext for action against Serbia.

This pivotal event set off the July Crisis, a rapid sequence of diplomatic and military escalations among Europe's great powers. Tensions reached a breaking point on 28 July 1914, when Austria-Hungary declared war on Serbia. Within days, the conflict expanded as Germany, France, Russia, and Great Britain issued their own declarations of war, plunging Europe into the First World War. Samuel Williamson, a preeminent authority on Austria-Hungary and its role in the lead-up to the war, asserts that Vienna's unwavering determination to exploit the assassination to subjugate Serbia and assert dominance over the Balkans was the principal driving force behind the outbreak of the global conflict.

== Arrest and trial ==
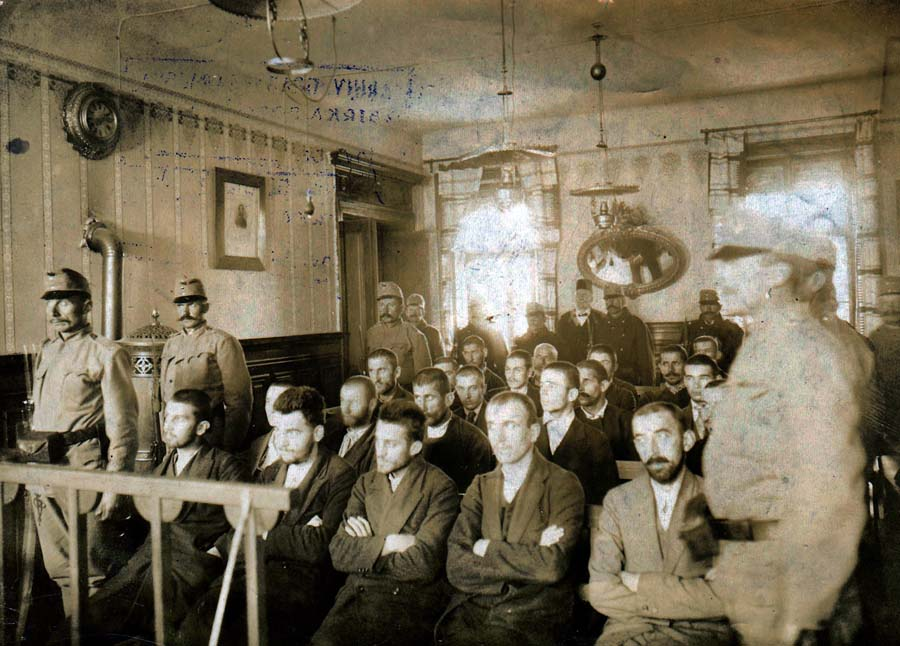
Princip, centre of first row, during the trial

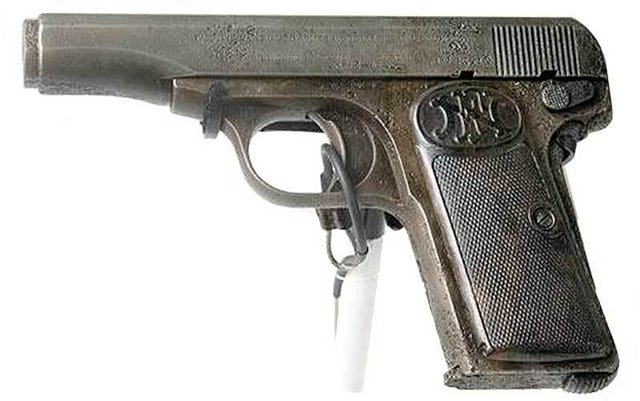
The FN Model 1910 pistol used by Princip in the assassination.

Before Princip could fire for a third time, the pistol was wrested from his hand and he was pushed to the ground. He managed to swallow a capsule of cyanide, which failed to kill him. The trial opened on 12 October and lasted until 23 October 1914. Princip and twenty-four people were indicted. All six assassins, except Mehmedbašić, were under twenty at the time of the assassination. While the group was dominated by Bosnian Serbs, four of the indicted were Bosnian Croats and all of them were Austro-Hungarian citizens, none being from Serbia. The state's attorney charged twenty-two of the accused with high treason and murder and three with complicity in the murder. Princip stated that he regretted the killing of the Duchess and meant to kill Potiorek, but was nonetheless proud of what he had done. The Austrian police investigators were eager to emphasise the exclusively Serbian nature of the assassination plot for political reasons, but during his trial Princip insisted that, even though he was an ethnic Serb, his commitment was to freeing all south Slavs. All the chief conspirators mentioned the revolutionary destruction of Austria-Hungary and the liberation of the South Slavs as the motivation behind their act.

I am a Yugoslav nationalist, aiming for the unification of all Yugoslavs, and I do not care what form of state, but it must be free from Austria... The plan was to unite all South Slavs. It was understood that Serbia as the free part of the South Slavs had the moral duty to help in the unification, to be to the South Slavs as the Piedmont was to Italy... In my opinion every Serb, Croat and Slovene should be an enemy of Austria.

— Gavrilo Princip, to the court,

The Austro-Hungarian authorities tried to hide the fact that the conspirators included Croats and Bosniaks, going as far as changing the name of one of them in the press reports, to portray the entire scheme as being of Serbian origin and carried out only by Serbs. Since it provided the weapons to the assassins and helped them cross the border, the Black Hand was implicated in the assassination. This did not prove that the Serbian government knew about the assassination, let alone approved of it, (Note: After the war it was revealed that the Serbian government heard about a possible plot to assassinate the Archduke and had immediately issued orders for border guards to be on the lookout for young Bosnians.) but was enough for Austria-Hungary to issue a démarche to Serbia known as the July Ultimatum, which led up to the outbreak of World War I. According to David Fromkin what the killings gave Vienna was not a reason, but an excuse, for destroying Serbia.

Princip was nineteen years old at the time and too young to be executed, as he was twenty-seven days shy of the twenty-year minimum age limit required by Habsburg law. On Thursday 28 October 1914 the court found Princip guilty of murder and high treason, he received the maximum sentence of twenty years in prison, he was to serve out his sentence in a military prison within the Habsburg fortress of Theresienstadt in northern Bohemia (now in the Czech Republic).

== Imprisonment and death ==
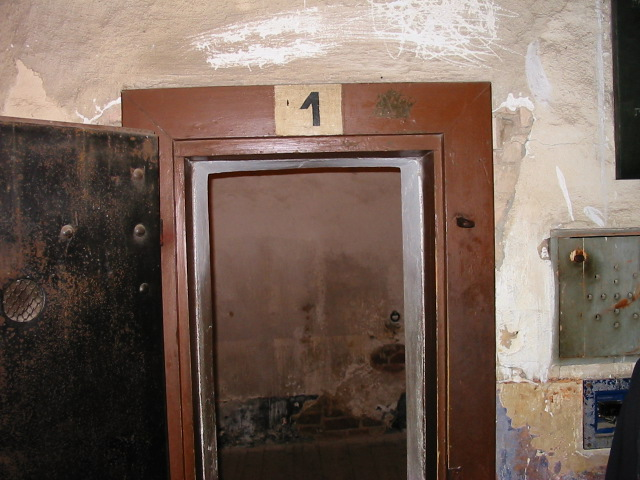
Princip's cell at the Terezín fortress

Princip was chained to a wall and held in solitary confinement at the Small Fortress in Theresienstadt (present-day Terezín, Czech Republic), where his tuberculosis worsened. The disease, aggravated by the harsh conditions of his imprisonment, ultimately led to the amputation of his right arm.

From February to June 1916, Princip was interviewed four times by Martin Pappenheim, a psychiatrist in the Austro-Hungarian army. According to Pappenheim, Princip stated that the First World War would have occurred even without the Sarajevo assassination, and that he "cannot feel himself responsible for the catastrophe".

Princip died on 28 April 1918, nearly four years after the assassination. At the time of his death, weakened by tuberculosis and prolonged malnutrition, he weighed only about 40 kilograms (88 lb; 6 st 4 lb).

== Legacy ==
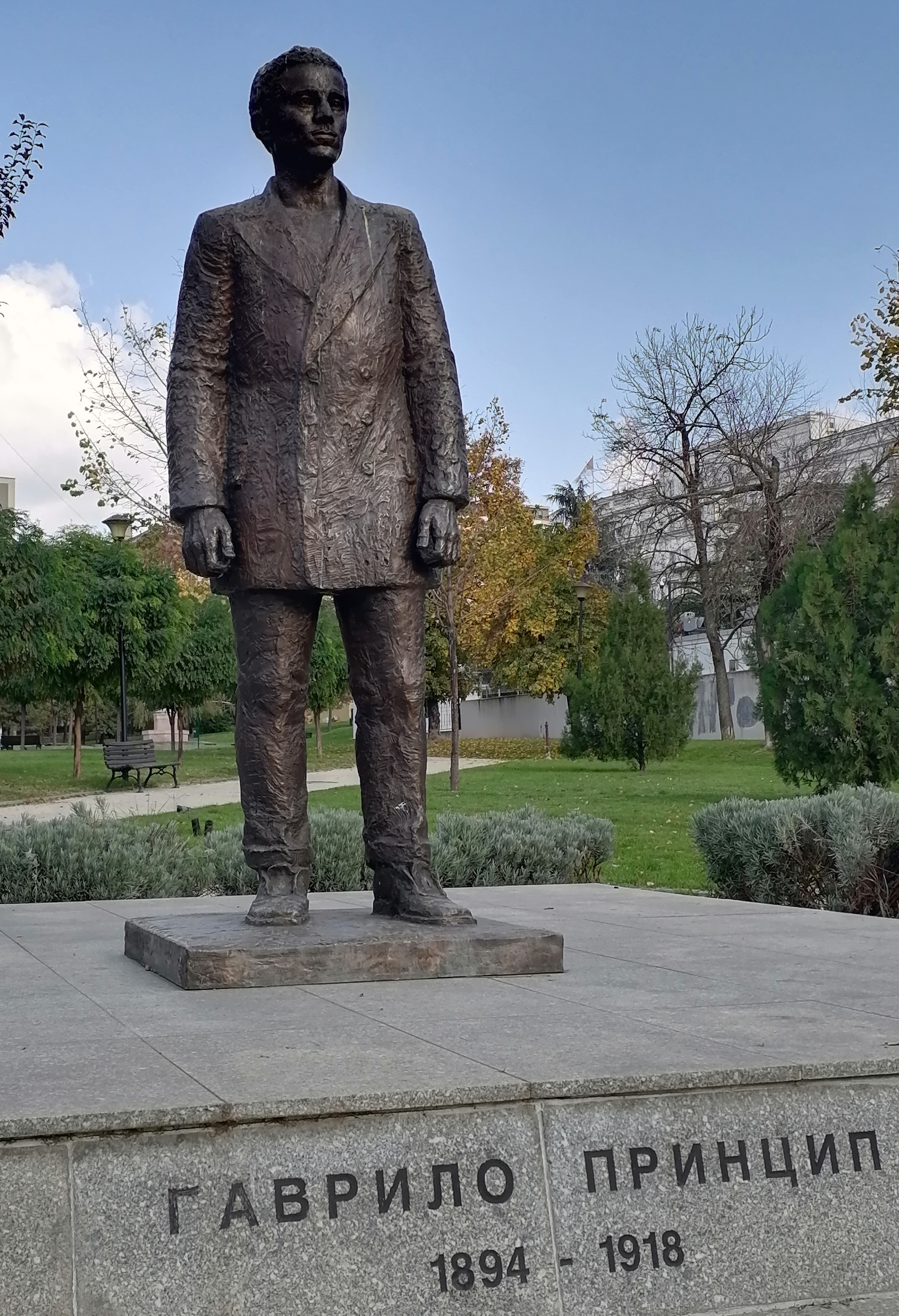
Princip's bronze statue in Belgrade

Long after his death, Princip's legacy is still disputed, and he remains a historically significant but polarising figure. For the Habsburg monarchy and its supporters, he was a murderous terrorist; the Kingdom of Yugoslavia portrayed him as a Yugoslav hero; during World War II, Nazis and Croatian fascist Ustaše viewed him as a degenerate criminal and a left-wing anarchist; and for socialist Yugoslavia, he represented a youthful hero of armed resistance, a freedom fighter who fought to liberate all the peoples of Yugoslavia from Imperial rule, fighting for the workers and the oppressed. In 1920, Princip and the other conspirators were exhumed and brought to Sarajevo, where they were buried together beneath the Vidovdan Heroes Chapel. In the 1990s, Princip started to be seen by some as a Serbian nationalist acting for the creation of a Greater Serbia. Political movements and regimes have either praised or demonized him to promote their ideology.

As of 2014, he was still celebrated as a hero by numerous Serbs and regarded as a terrorist by many Croats and Bosniaks. Asim Sarajlić, a senior MP of the Bosniak nationalist Party of Democratic Action, stated in 2014 that Princip brought an end to "a golden era of history under Austrian rule" and that "we are strongly against the mythology of Princip as a fighter of freedom". Many of Bosnia's Serbs continue to venerate his memory: Nenad Samardžija, the Serb governor of East Sarajevo, said in 2014 that "we once all lived in one state (Yugoslavia), and we never looked on it as any kind of terrorist act" but "a movement of young people who wanted to liberate themselves from colonial slavery". Princip's nephew Slobodan Princip was a communist and died as a Yugoslav Partisan in 1942, later being posthumously awarded the Order of the People's Hero.

=== Memorials and commemoration ===
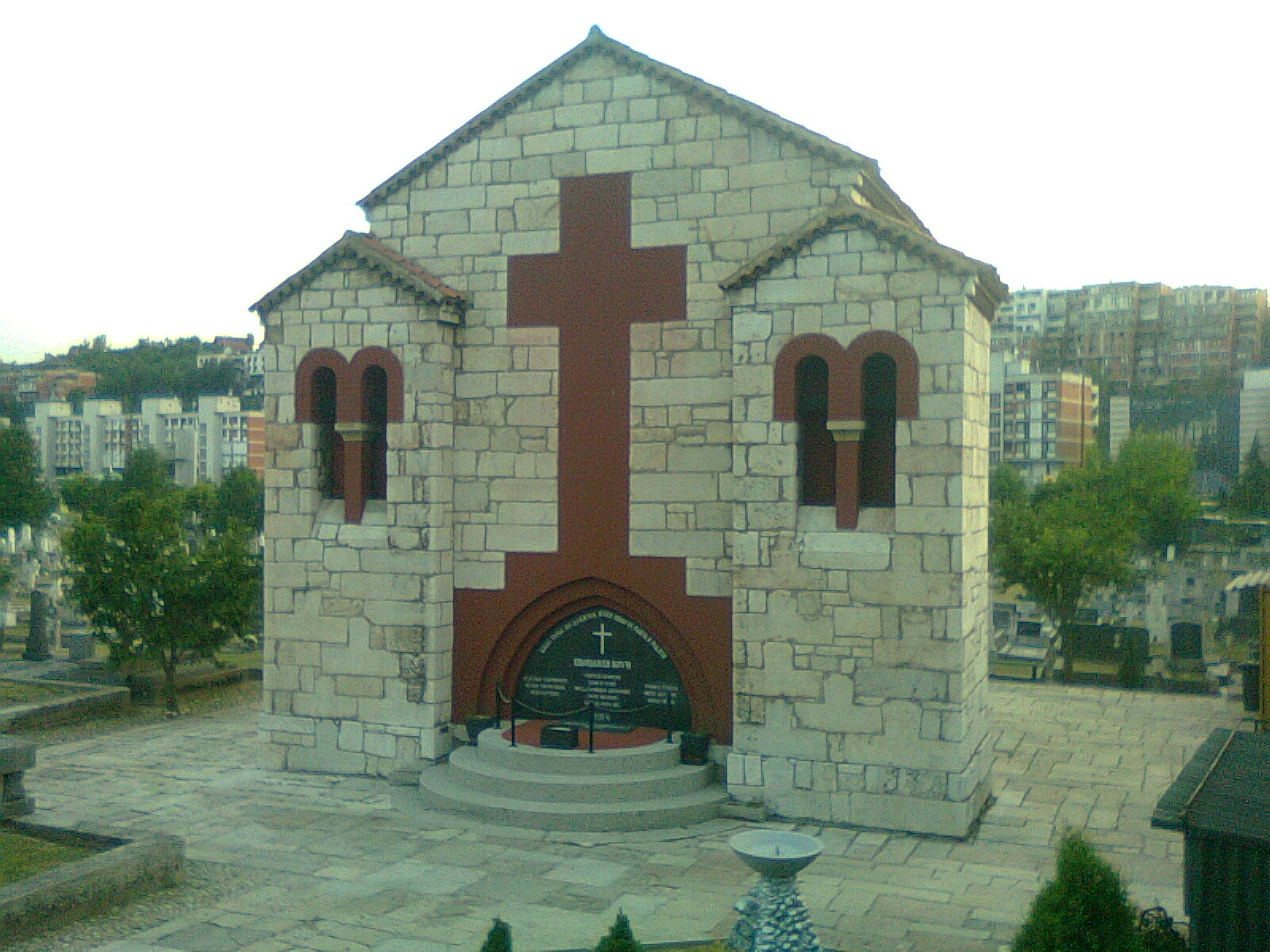
The Vidovdan Heroes Chapel at the Holy Archangels Cemetery outside Sarajevo where Princip was buried in 1920 along with his co-conspirators

The house where Princip lived in Sarajevo was destroyed during World War I. After the war, it was rebuilt as a museum in the Kingdom of Yugoslavia. Yugoslavia was conquered by Germany in 1941 and Sarajevo became part of the "Independent State of Croatia". The Croatian Ustaše destroyed the house again. After the establishment of Communist Yugoslavia in 1944, the house was rebuilt, became a museum again, and there was another museum dedicated to him within the city of Sarajevo. During the Yugoslav Wars of the 1990s, the house was destroyed again and then rebuilt for the third time in 2015.

Princip's pistol was confiscated by the authorities and eventually given, along with the Archduke's blood-stained undershirt, to Anton Puntigam, a Jesuit priest who was a close friend of the Archduke and had given the Archduke and his wife their last rites. The pistol and shirt remained in the possession of the Austrian Jesuits until they were offered on long-term loan to the Museum of Military History in Vienna in 2004. It is now part of the permanent exhibition there. During the Yugoslavian era, Latin Bridge, the site of the assassination, was renamed Princip's Bridge in remembrance; it reverted to its old name Latinska Cuprija in 1992. In Sarajevo about a half-dozen memorials to Gavrilo Princip have been erected on the site and torn down with each change in power.

In 1917, a pillar was constructed at the corner of where the assassination took place. It was destroyed the following year. In 1941, the 1930 plaque commemorating Princip was removed by the local Germans when the German Army invaded Bosnia. It was presented to Adolf Hitler as a birthday gift and kept in a museum, only to be lost after 1945. After World War II, a new plaque went up which claimed that "Gavrilo Princip threw off the German occupiers". During the Bosnian War, embossed footprints marking where Princip fired the fatal shots were torn out.

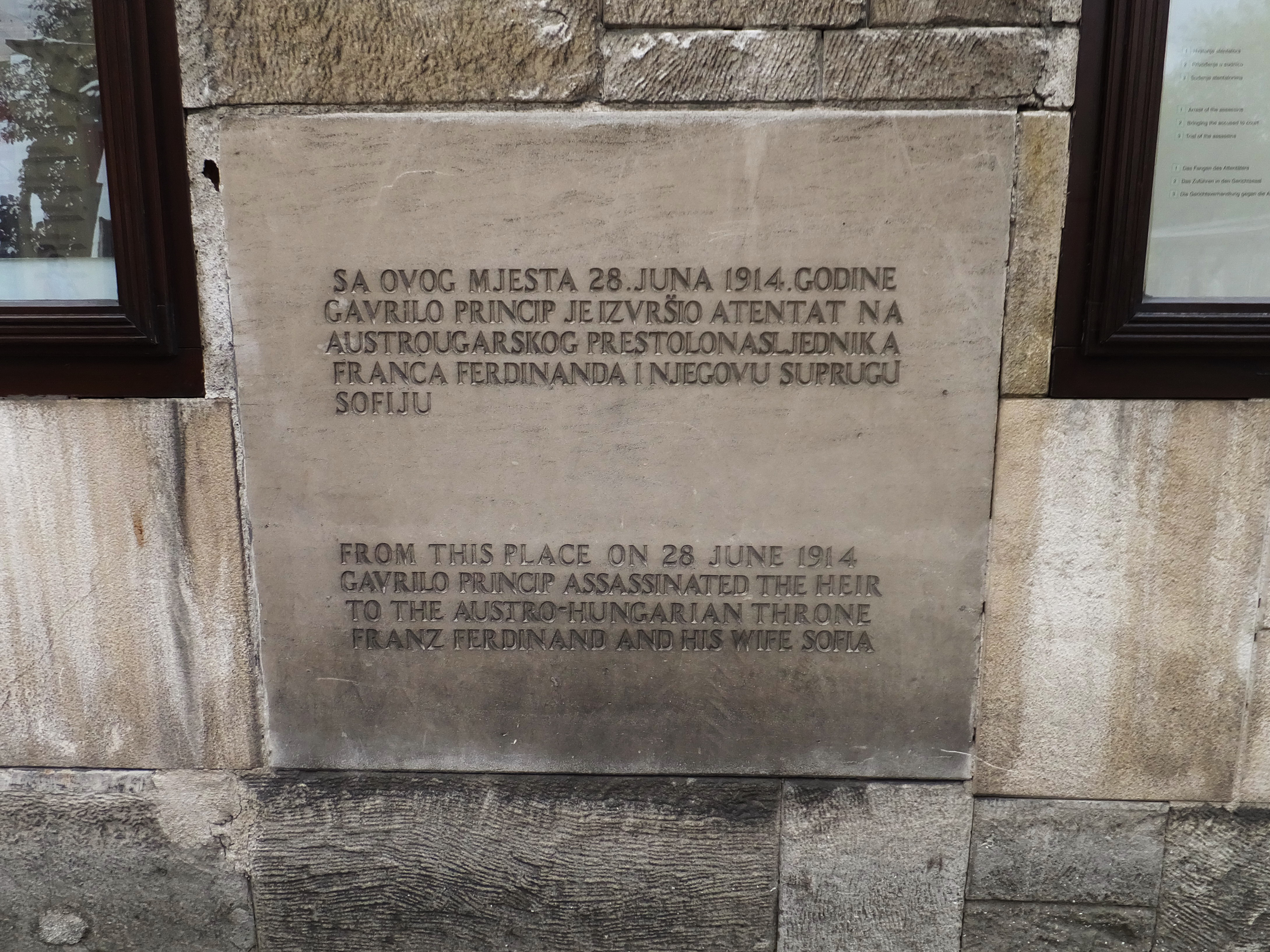
Plaque marking the assassination site

As the centenary of the assassination neared, an apolitical plaque was put up at the corner where the assassination took place, which states: "From this place on 28 June 1914, Gavrilo Princip assassinated the heir to the Austro-Hungarian throne Franz Ferdinand and his wife Sofia." On 21 April 2014, a bust of Princip was unveiled in Tovariševo, and on the centenary itself, a statue was erected in East Sarajevo. During the centenary commemorations, protesters wearing Princip masks demonstrated outside Sarajevo Town Hall, criticising the official events as expensive and out of touch with the country's economic difficulties. A year later, a statue of Princip was unveiled in Belgrade by President of Serbia Tomislav Nikolić and the President of Republika Srpska Milorad Dodik, as a gift from Republika Srpska to Serbia. At the unveiling Nikolić gave a speech, saying in part: "Princip was a hero, a symbol of liberation ideas, tyrant-killer, idea-holder of liberation from slavery, which spanned through Europe".

On 11 November 2018, the 100th anniversary of the end of World War I, Princess Anita of Hohenberg, the eldest great-grandchild of Archduke Franz Ferdinand, and Branislav Princip, grandnephew of Gavrilo Princip, shook hands in a symbolic act of reconciliation in Graz, Austria.

== Portrayals ==
=== Film ===
In the German drama film 1914 (1931), Carl Balhaus played Gavrilo Princip. Irfan Mensur played Princip in The Day That Shook the World (1975), based on the assassination. In the Austrian biopic Death of a Schoolboy (1990, original German title Gavre Princip – Himmel unter Steinen) by Peter Patzak about Princip's life, he was portrayed by British actor and director Reuben Pillsbury. He is portrayed by Eugen Knecht in Sarajevo (2014), a German-Austrian television film based on the assassination, and by Joel Basman in The King's Man (2021), the third film in the Kingsman fiction film series.

== See also ==
- Miloš Obilić, legendary assassin of Ottoman Sultan Murad I
- Blagoje Jovović, alleged assassin of Croatian dictator Ante Pavelić

== Sources ==
=== Bibliography ===
- Armour, I.D. (2012). A History of Eastern Europe 1740–1918: Empires, Nations and Modernisation. Bloomsbury Publishing. ISBN 978-1-84966-660-2.
- Butcher, T. (2015). The Trigger: Hunting the Assassin Who Brought the World to War. Vintage Books. Vintage Publishing. ISBN 978-0-09-958133-8.
- Clark, Christopher (2013). The Sleepwalkers: How Europe Went to War in 1914. HarperCollins. ISBN 978-0-06-219922-5.
- Dedijer, Vladimir (1966). The Road to Sarajevo. Simon and Schuster. ASIN B0007DMDI2.
- Donia, R.J. (2006). Sarajevo: A Biography. University of Michigan Press. ISBN 978-0-472-11557-0.
- Fabijančić, Tony (2010). Bosnia: In the Footsteps of Gavrilo Princip. Edmonton: University of Alberta. ISBN 978-0-88864-519-7.
- Fromkin, D. (2009). Europe's Last Summer. Random House. ISBN 978-1-4090-4402-4.
- Fromkin, David (2007). Europe's Last Summer: Who Started the Great War in 1914?. New York: Random House. ISBN 978-0-307-42578-2.
- Fried, M. (2014). Austro-Hungarian War Aims in the Balkans during World War I. Palgrave Macmillan UK. ISBN 978-1-137-35901-8.
- Glenny, Misha (2012). The Balkans: Nationalism, War, and the Great Powers, 1804–2012: New and Updated (revised ed.). Penguin. ISBN 978-1-77089-274-3.
- Johnson, Lonnie (1989). Introducing Austria: A short history. Ariadne Press. ISBN 0-929497-03-1.
- Kidner, Frank; Bucur, Maria; Mathisen, Ralph; McKee, Sally; Weeks, Theodore (2013). Making Europe: The Story of the West Since 1550. Vol. 2 (2nd ed.). Boston: Wadsworth Cengage. ISBN 978-1-111-84134-8.
- Malcolm, Noel (1994). Bosnia: A Short History. New York: New York University Press. ISBN 978-0-8147-5520-4.
- Meaker, S.S.F. (2015). World War One: A Concise History - The Great War. StreetLib. ISBN 978-88-925-1371-6.
- Remak, Joachim (1959). Sarajevo: The Story of a Political Murder. Criterion. ASIN B001L4NB5U.
- Roberts, Elizabeth (2007). Realm of the Black Mountain. Hurst. ISBN 978-1-85065-868-9.
- Roider, Karl (2005). "Princip, Gavrilo (1894–1918)". In Tucker, Spencer C.; Roberts, Priscilla Mary (eds.). The Encyclopedia of World War I : A Political, Social, and Military History. Santa Barbara, California: ABC-CLIO. ISBN 978-1-85109-420-2.
- Sageman, M. (2017). Turning to Political Violence: The Emergence of Terrorism. University of Pennsylvania Press, Incorporated. ISBN 978-0-8122-4877-7.
- Schlesser, Steven (2005). The Soldier, the Builder & the Diplomat. Seattle: Cune Press. ISBN 978-1-885942-07-4.
- Shermer, M. (2022). Conspiracy: Why the Rational Believe the Irrational. Johns Hopkins University Press. ISBN 978-1-4214-4445-1.
- Sked, Alan (2014). "Austria-Hungary and the First World War". Histoire@Politique. 22 (1). OpenEdition: 16. doi:10.3917/hp.022.0016. ISSN 1954-3670.
- Wilson, S. (2016). Resting Places: The Burial Sites of More Than 14,000 Famous Persons, 3d ed. Academic & Nonfiction Books anthology. McFarland, Incorporated, Publishers. ISBN 978-1-4766-2599-7.

=== Websites ===
- Dzidic, Denis; Ristic, Marija; Domanovic, Milka; Ivanovic, Josip; Peci, Edona; Marusic, Sinisa Jakov (6 May 2014). "Gavrilo Princip: hero or villain?". the Guardian.
- Foy, Simon (22 June 2004). "Found: the gun that shook the world". The Telegraph. Archived from the original on 11 January 2022.
- "Gavrilo Princip's Legacy Still Contested". Institute for War and Peace Reporting. 28 June 1914.
- "Man accused of murdering Archduke Ferdinand goes on trial – archive, 1914". the Guardian. 17 October 2017.
- MacDowall, Andrew (27 June 2014). "Villain or hero? Sarajevo is split on archduke's assassin Gavrilo Princip". the Guardian.
- "A Century Ago in Sarajevo: A Plot, A Farce And A Fateful Shot". NPR.org. 27 June 2014.
- "The Shifting Legacy of the Man Who Shot Franz Ferdinand". NPR.org. 27 June 2014.
- Prijic, Ermina (29 June 2015). "101st Anniversary of the Sarajevo Assassination that caused the World War I". Sarajevo Times.
- "Archduke Franz Ferdinand of Austria – Prague Blog". Prague Guide ~ Prague Tours ~ Private Guided Tours. 1 July 1900.
- Robinson, Matt; Sito-Sucic, Daria (11 March 2014). "An assassin divides his native Bosnia 100 years on". U.S.
- "Gavrilo Princip, a participant in the assassination of Archduke Franz Ferdinand". The British Library. 1 May 2017. Archived from the original on 1 May 2017.
