= Austro-Hungarian entry into World War I =

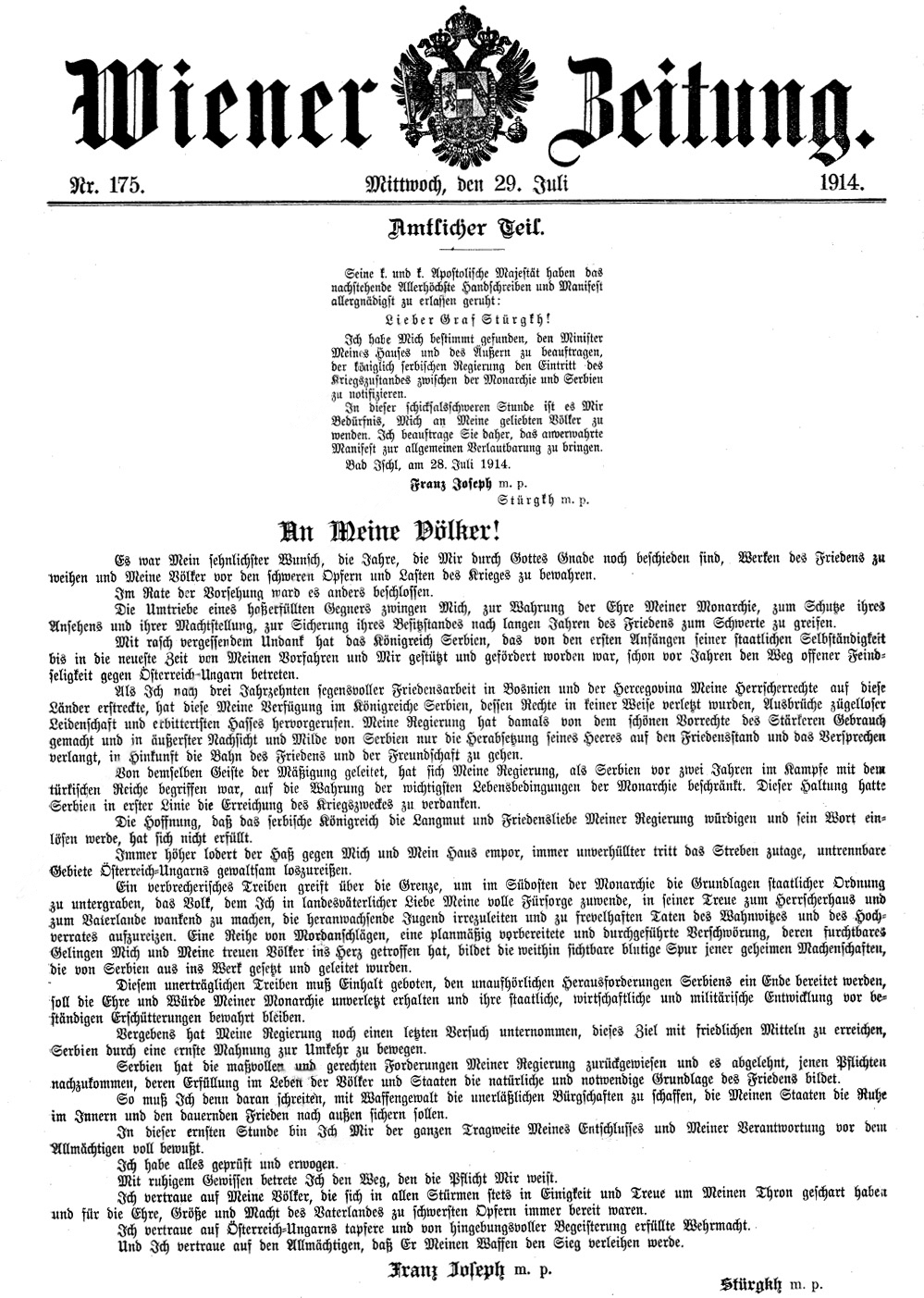
To my peoples!, the manifesto announcing Austria-Hungary's declaration of war against Serbia.

On 28 July 1914, Austria-Hungary declared war on Serbia because of the Assassination of Archduke Franz Ferdinand. Within days, long-standing mobilization plans went into effect to initiate invasions or guard against them and Russia, France and Britain stood arrayed against Austria and Germany in what at the time was called the "Great War", and was later named "World War I" or the "First World War". Austria thought in terms of one small limited war involving just the two countries. It did not plan a wider war such as exploded in a matter of days.

The British historian John Zametica argued that Austria-Hungary was primarily responsible for starting the war, as its leaders believed that a successful war against Serbia was the only way it could remain a Great Power, solve deep internal disputes caused by Hungarian demands and regain influence in the Balkan states. Others, most notably Christopher Clark, have argued that Austria-Hungary, confronted with a neighbor determined to incite continual unrest and ultimately acquire all of the Serb-inhabited lands of the empire (according to the Pan-Serb point of view, they included all of Croatia, Dalmatia, Bosnia, Hercegovina and some of the southern counties of the Hungary (roughly corresponding to today's Vojvodina)) and had a military and government that were intertwined with the irredentist terrorist group known as "The Black Hand", saw no practical alternative to the use of force in ending what amounted to subversion from Serbia directed at a large chunk of its territories. In that perspective, Austria had little choice but to credibly threaten war and force Serbian submission if it wished to remain a Great Power.

The view of the key figures in the "war party" in the Tsarist government and many military leaders in Russia that Germany had deliberately incited Austria-Hungary to attack Serbia to have a pretext for war with Russia and France, was promoted by the German historian Fritz Fischer from the 1960s onwards but is no longer accepted by mainstream historians. One of the key drivers of the outbreak of war were two key misperceptions that were radically at odds. The key German decision-makers convinced themselves that Russia would accept an Austrian counter-strike on Serbia and were neither ready for nor seeking a general European war, but they instead engaged in a bluff, especially because Russia had backed down in earlier crises in 1908 and again over Albania in October 1913. At the very same time, the most important Russian decision-makers viewed any decisive Austrian response as necessarily dictated by and fomented in Berlin and therefore proof of an active German desire for war against Russia.

There had been no serious joint planning with Germany before the war started and little during the war itself, as leaders in Vienna distrusted German ambitions.

== Key players and goals ==
A small group made the decisions for Austria-Hungary. They included the aged Emperor Franz Joseph; his heir, Franz Ferdinand; Army Chief of Staff Franz Conrad von Hötzendorf; Foreign Minister Leopold Berchtold; Minister-President Karl von Stürgkh; and Finance Minister Leon Bilinski, all of whom were Austrians. The key Hungarian leaders were Prime Minister István Tisza, the minister István Burián and the advisor Lajos Thallóczy.

Austria-Hungary avoided major wars in the era between 1867 and 1914 but engaged in a number of minor military actions. The Austro-Hungarian General Staff maintained plans for major wars against neighboring powers, especially Italy, Serbia and Russia. The major decisions on military affairs in 1867 to 1895 were made by Archduke Albrecht, Duke of Teschen, the nephew of the Emperor Franz Joseph and his leading advisor. According to the historians John Keegan and Andrew Wheatcroft:

He was a firm conservative in all matters, military and civil, and took to writing pamphlets lamenting the state of the Army's morale as well as fighting a fierce rearguard action against all forms of innovation.... Much of the Austrian failure in the First World War can be traced back to his long period of power.... His power was that of the bureaucrat, not the fighting soldier, and his thirty years of command over the peacetime Habsburg Army made it a flabby instrument of war.

As Europe engaged in an arms race from the late 1890s forwards, Austria-Hungary lagged behind by spending the least percentage of its economic potential on its armed forces of all the great powers (2.6% of GDP compared to Russia's 4.5% in 1912). Austro-Hungarian Chief of Staff von Hötzendorf's repeated urgings of "preventative war" against nearly all of Austria's adversaries at one time or another had no rational basis in the actual balance of military power.

The far more realistic and cautious Franz Ferdinand, despite his deep personal affection for von Hötzendorf, realized that the rise of Pan-Slavism could rip the empire apart, and his solution was called "Trialism". The empire would be restructured three ways, instead of two, with the Slavic element given representation at the highest levels equivalent to what Austria and Hungary now had. Serbians saw that as a threat to their dream of a new state of Yugoslavia, and it was a factor in motivating the Archduke's assassination in 1914. Hungarian leaders had a predominant voice in imperial circles and strongly rejected Trialism because it would liberate many of their minorities from Hungarian rule, which was considered oppressive. Despite postwar accounts that attempted to make of the heir to the throne a convenient villain in favour of war, Franz Ferdinand, as well as the most public figures of note, supported improved status for the southern and the other Slavs in the empire, was adamantly opposed to annexing Serbia or to war in general and insisted that the monarchy was too fragile internally for foreign adventures. Except for a few days in December 1912, the Archduke repeatedly intervened in government debates during the various Balkan crises of 1908, 1912 and 1913 before his own murder by insisting that advocates of war with Serbia, especially von Hötzendorf, were servants of the Crown who "consciously or unconsciously worked to damage the monarchy".

Zametica argues that by 1909, war with Serbia was the main plan of the "war party" at Vienna. The long-term goal was to stop Russia from forming a Balkan league that would permanently stifle Austria's ambitions:

Defeating Serbia would effectively destroy what Vienna saw as a potentially menacing, Russian-inspired Balkan league, because such a league without Serbia would simply be a non-starter.... Last, but not least, a successful war against Serbia would at the same time solve the Monarchy's South Slav question—or at least ensure that Serbia could no longer play a role in it because the country would either not exist at all or it would be too small to matter.... In short, smashing Serbia would make Austria-Hungary the unchallenged master of South Eastern Europe. It was a dazzling prospect.

After Serbia's spectacular military performance in the two Balkan Wars of 1912 and 1913, Vienna succeeded in forcing Serbia's army to finally withdraw from Albania in 1913, but the goal of maintaining traditional sway over Serbia gave way to alarm. Serbia had quintupled in territory, enormous French loans permitted a rapid rearmament and enhancement of its military forces and its newspapers were replete with calls for incorporating Serbian-majority areas of the Habsburg Empire into a Greater Serbia. Anxiety over the long-term survival of Austria-Hungary reached a new pitch of intensity among its governing elite.

== Relations with key countries ==
Austria made several overtures for friendlier relations with Russia after 1907, but they were undermined by espionage, propaganda and hostile diplomacy by France. Austria decided the villain was probably Théophile Delcassé, the French ambassador to Russia. The one seeming success of the effort, a secret agreement with Russian Foreign Minister Alexander Izvolsky for Russian compliance to Austro-Hungarian annexation of Bosnia, itself predicted and assented to in numerous secret agreements between Russia and Austria after the Congress of Berlin in return for Austrian support for Russian military control of the Turkish Straits, the Bosporus and Dardanelles, backfired spectacularly when the Russian press and nationalist politicians in the Duma pilloried Izvolsky by decrying the annexation as a 'humiliation' for Russia. Izolvsky then reversed himself, denying the secret agreement, only to be caught out when Germany ended the crisis by threatening to back Austria up if Russia attacked it over the Bosnian annexation and threatening to release the secret documents that made Izvolsky's secret consent to the annexation a proven fact. The controversy destroyed Izvolsky's career, embittered him and made him become an ardent advocate of war against Austria-Hungary after Tsar Nicholas II of Russia had dismissed him the following year, in 1910, and replaced him with Sergey Sazonov.

Although Germany and Austria knew full well that they would be outnumbered in a major war with the Franco-Russian Alliance (made in 1894 and perhaps the only unambiguous alliance in the pre-war constellation that few doubted would perform as promised), they made no effort to develop joint plans or to familiarise themselves with the other's strength and weaknesses. After the war had started, they remained far apart. Austria had deceived itself by trusting Conrad's elaborate plans and not realizing how bad was the Army's morale, how inefficient and cumbersome was the reserve system, how thin were its stocks of munitions and supplies or how badly its rail network had deteriorated with respect to Russia in recent years. Year by year, as Germany discovered the depth of the weaknesses of Austria's military and Vienna's inability to remedy its deep defects, it was increasingly necessary for Germany to take more and more control of Austrian military operations. In the period leading up to the outbreak of war, German policy-makers, from Chancellor Theobald von Bethmann Hollweg to the mercurial Kaiser himself, had convinced themselves that Russia was unlikely to go to war to protect Serbia rather inexplicably, but Sazonov indeed had forced the Serbs to back down in the Albania Crisis just a year earlier.

== Assassination ==
On 28 June 1914, Archduke Franz Ferdinand visited the Bosnian capital, Sarajevo. A group of six assassins (Cvjetko Popović, Gavrilo Princip, Muhamed Mehmedbašić, Nedeljko Čabrinović, Trifko Grabež, Vaso Čubrilović) from the nationalist group Mlada Bosna who were supplied by the Black Hand, had gathered on the street on which the Archduke's motorcade would pass. Čabrinović threw a grenade at the car but missed. It injured some people in the next car and some bystanders, and Franz Ferdinand's convoy could carry on. The other assassins failed to act as the cars drove past them quickly. About an hour later, when Franz Ferdinand was on his way to visit the Sarajevo Hospital, his convoy took a wrong turn into a street on which Gavrilo Princip by coincidence stood. With a pistol, Princip shot and killed Franz Ferdinand and his wife, Sophie. Princip attempted to take the cyanide capsule that had been supplied to him in Belgrade, but he could not swallow all of it before the horrified crowd of Sarajevans attacked him (the police intervened to seize the suspect, who was on the verge of being lynched). The initial reaction among the Austrian people was mild, almost indifferent; since the Archduke was not particularly popular. The historian Z. A. B. Zeman notes that "the event almost failed to make any impression whatsoever. On Sunday and Monday [June 28 and 29], the crowds in Vienna listened to music and drank wine, as if nothing had happened". Almost no one understood how critical the heir to the throne was in strengthening his elderly uncle's preference for peace and suspicion of wars. Over a period of days, public opinion, moved by the Archduke's last words to his Czech wife, Sophie von Chotek, "Sophie, Sophie, don't die, stay alive for our children!", which were reported widely in the press, and the authentic revelations of Franz Ferdinand's devotion to his family, took quite a different turn.

The assassination was not necessarily a great event but was the reaction of multiple nations that turned it into one. The historian Christopher Clark compares Sarajevo with the September 11, 2001 attacks in New York City. Both:

exemplified the way in which a single or symbolic event – however deeply it may be enmeshed in larger historical processes – can change politics irrevocably, rendering old options obsolete and endowing new ones with an unforeseen urgency.

Apart from Hötzendorf, Berchtold and other decision-makers were concerned to establish via the criminal investigation of the conspiracy against Franz Ferdinand that elements within Serbia that were deep inside its military and government were indeed complicit in the plot. Grey proposed a mediation effort after Vienna had delivered its ultimatum to Serbia in a highly unfavorable manner. Russian diplomats had insisted to the British Foreign Office that Serbia was blameless in the assassination, a statement that was at odds by the claim of Serbia's Ambassador in St. Petersburg, Miroslav Spalajković, that Serbia had warned Vienna about the plot in advance (Spalajković had also repeatedly denied that any such organization as "The Black Hand" existed, but its chief was in fact the head of Serbia's Military Intelligence, Dragutin Dimitrijević, known as Apis). Spalajković also told a Russian newspaper that Austrian arrests of Serb militants in Bosnia might lead Belgrade to attack the Habsburg Dual Monarchy before the Austrian ultimatum had even been drafted.

== Strategic plans and diplomatic maneuvering ==
While the civilian politicians and diplomats of the Dual Monarchy were kept in the dark, the intelligence catastrophe of the Redl Affair (Austria's head of counter-intelligence having been unmasked as a Russian mole in 1913) ensured that Russia knew nearly every detail of the Chief of Staff's plans, as did Serbia.

=== Planning and discussion of an ultimatum ===
==== Tisza alone opposes war with Serbia ====
One puzzle of the crisis was the slowness with which Austria-Hungary moved toward war with Serbia. At a meeting of the Crown Council, all involved were in full favour of war except Hungarian Prime Minister István Tisza. Tisza warned that any attack on Serbia "would, as far as can humanly be foreseen, lead to an intervention by Russia and hence a world war". He insisted on a diplomatic effort and categorically ruled out a swift retaliatory attack.

The rest of the participants debated about whether Austria should just launch an unprovoked attack or issue an ultimatum to Serbia with demands so stringent that it was bound to be rejected. Austrian Prime Minister Stürgkh warned Tisza that if Austria did not launch a war, its "policy of hesitation and weakness" would cause Germany to abandon Austria-Hungary as an ally. All present, except Tisza, finally agreed that Austria-Hungary should present an ultimatum designed to be rejected. It took the week of 7–14 July to persuade Tisza to support war.

==== Other diplomats ====
Starting 7 July, the German Ambassador to Austria-Hungary, Heinrich von Tschirschky, and Austro-Hungarian Foreign Minister Berchtold held almost daily meetings about how to co-ordinate the diplomatic action to justify a war against Serbia. On 8 July, Tschirschky presented Berchtold with a message from Wilhelm who declared he "stated most emphatically that Berlin expected the Monarchy to act against Serbia, and that Germany would not understand it, if ... the present opportunity were allowed to go by ... without a blow struck". At the same meeting, Tschirschky told Berchtold, "if we [Austria-Hungary] compromised or bargained with Serbia, Germany would interpret this as a confession of weakness, which could not be without effect on our position in the Triple Alliance and on Germany's future policy".

On 7 July, Bethmann Hollweg told his aide and close friend Kurt Riezler that "action against Serbia can lead to a world war" and that such a "leap in the dark" was justified by the international situation. Bethmann Hollweg explained to Riezler that Germany was "completely paralysed" and that the "future belongs to Russia which is growing and growing, and is becoming an ever increasing nightmare to us". Riezler went to write in his diary that Bethmann Hollweg painted a "devastating picture" with Russia building rail-roads in Poland allowing Russian forces to mobilize faster once the Great Military Programme was finished in 1917. Bethmann Hollweg reasoned the "existing order was lifeless and void of ideas" and that such a war could only be welcomed as a blessing to Germany. Such fears about Russia led Bethmann Hollweg to credit Anglo-Russian naval talks in May 1914 as the beginning of an "encirclement" policy against Germany that could only be broken through war.

On 8 July, Kurt Riezler's diary has his friend Bethmann Hollweg saying: "If the war comes from the East, so that we are marching to Austria-Hungary's aid instead of Austria-Hungary to ours, then we have a chance of winning it. If war does not come, if the Czar does not want it or France dismayed, counsels peace, then we still have a chance of maneuvering the Entente apart over this action."

On 9 July, Berchtold advised the Emperor that he would present Belgrade with an ultimatum containing demands that were designed to be rejected. This would ensure a war without the "odium of attacking Serbia without warning, put her in the wrong", and ensure that Britain and Romania would remain neutral. On 10 July, Berchtold told Tschirschky he would present Serbia with an ultimatum containing "unacceptable demands" as the best way of causing war, but "chief care" would be taken about how to present these "unacceptable demands". In response, Wilhelm wrote angrily on the margins of Tschirschky's dispatch "They had time enough for that!"

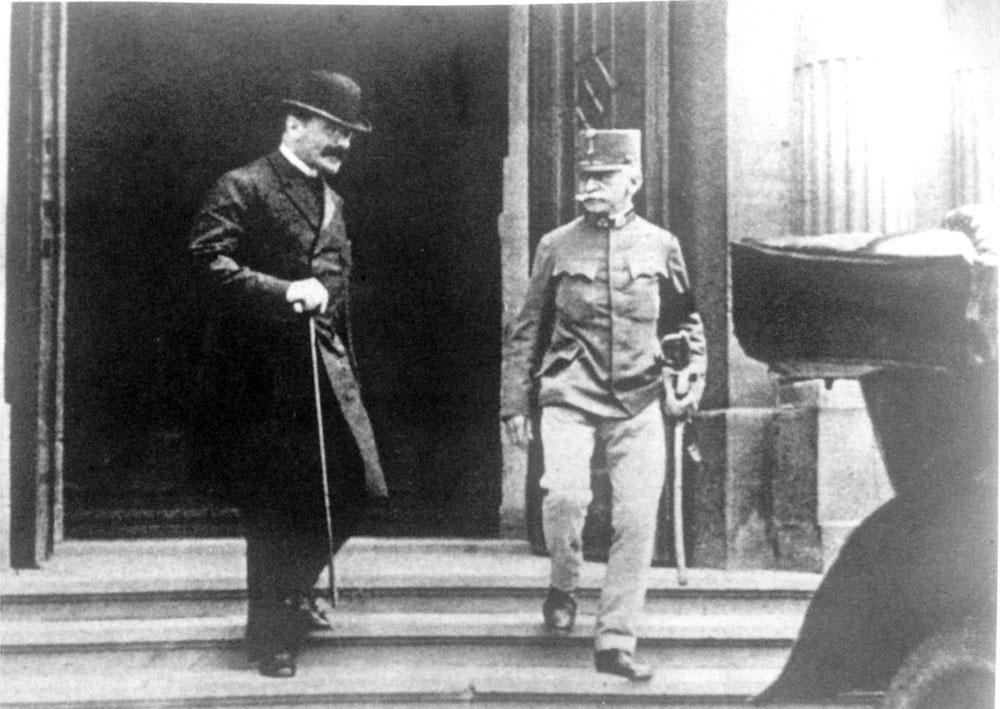
Hungarian Prime Minister Tisza and Chief of the Army General Staff Hötzendorf in Vienna, 15 July 1914

On 9 July, Prince Lichnowsky, the German Ambassador in London was told by British Foreign Secretary Edward Grey that he "saw no reason for taking a pessimistic view of the situation". Despite Tisza's opposition, Berchtold had ordered his officials to start drafting an ultimatum to Serbia on 10 July. The German Ambassador reported that "Count Berchtold appeared to hope that Serbia would not agree to the Austro-Hungarian demands, as a mere diplomatic victory would put the country here again in a stagnant mood". Count Hoyos told a German diplomat "that the demands were really of such a nature that no nation that still possessed self-respect and dignity could possibly accept them".

On 11 July, Tschirschky reported to Jagow that he "again took the occasion to discuss with Berchtold what action was to be taken against Serbia, chiefly in order to assure the minister once again, emphatically that speedy action was called for". On the same day, the German Foreign Office wanted to know if they should send a telegram congratulating King Peter of Serbia on his birthday. Wilhelm replied that not doing so might attract attention. (Note: "As Vienna has so far inaugurated no action of any sort against Belgrade, the omission of the customary telegram would be too noticeable and might be the cause of premature uneasiness ... It should be sent.") On 12 July, Szögyény reported from Berlin that everyone in the German government wanted to see Austria-Hungary declare war on Serbia at once, and were tired of Austrian indecision about whether to choose war or peace. (Note: "[A]bsolute insistence on a war against Serbia was based on the two considerations already mentioned; firstly that Russia and France were 'not yet ready' and secondly that Britain will not at this juncture intervene in a war which breaks out over a Balkan state, even if this should lead to a conflict with Russia, possibly also France ... Not only have Anglo-German relations so improved that Germany feels that she need no longer feel fear a directly hostile attitude by Britain, but above all, Britain at this moment is anything but anxious for war, and has no wish whatever to pull chestnuts out of the fire for Serbia, or in the last instance, Russia ... In general, then, it appears from all this that the political constellation is as favourable for us as it could possibly be.")

On 12 July, Berchtold showed Tschirschky the contents of his ultimatum containing "unacceptable demands", and promised to present it to the Serbs after the Franco-Russian summit between President Poincaré and Nicholas II was over. Wilhelm wrote on the margins of Tschirschky's dispatch "What a pity!" that the ultimatum would be presented so late in July. By 14 July, Tisza agreed to support war out of fear that a policy of peace would lead to Germany renouncing the Dual Alliance of 1879. On that day, Tschirschky reported to Berlin that Austria-Hungary would present an ultimatum "which would almost certainly be rejected and should result in war". That same day, Jagow sent instructions to Prince Lichnowsky, the German Ambassador in London, stating Germany had decided to do everything within its power to cause an Austro-Serbian war, but Germany must avoid the impression "that we were egging Austria on to war".

Jagow described a war against Serbia as Austria-Hungary's last chance at "political rehabilitation". He stated that under no circumstances did he want a peaceful solution, and though he did not want a preventive war, he would not "jib at the post" if such a war came because Germany was ready for it, and Russia "fundamentally was not". Russia and Germany being destined to fight each other, Jagow believed that now was the best time for the inevitable war, because: "in a few years Russia ... will be ready. Then she will crush us on land by weight of numbers, and she will have her Baltic Fleet and her strategic railroads ready. Our group meanwhile is getting weaker".

Jagow's belief that the summer of 1914 was the best time for Germany to go to war was widely shared in the German government. Many German officials believed that the "Teuton race" and "Slav race" were destined to fight each other in a terrible "race war" for the domination of Europe, and that now was the best time for such a war to come. The Chief of the German General Staff, Moltke, told Count Lerchenfeld, the Bavarian Minister in Berlin, that "a moment so favourable from the military point of view might never occur again". Moltke argued that due to the alleged superiority of German weaponry and training, combined with the recent change in the French Army from a two-year to a three-year period of service, Germany could easily defeat both France and Russia in 1914.

On 13 July, Austrian investigators into the assassination of Franz Ferdinand reported to Berchtold that there was little evidence that the Serbian government had abetted the murders. (Note: "There is nothing to prove or even to suppose that the Serbian government is accessory to the inducement for the crime, its preparations, or the furnishing of weapons. On the contrary, there are reasons to believe that this is altogether out of the question.") This report depressed Berchtold as it meant there was little evidence to support his pretext of Serbian government involvement in Franz Ferdinand's assassination.

=== Alliance with Germany ===
Austria depended entirely on Germany for support and had no other reliable ally. Though Italy was nominally a member of the Triple Alliance, earlier Balkan crises had revealed strong frictions between Italy and Austria-Hungary. Italy remained neutral in 1914 and instead joined the Allies (the Entente powers) in 1915. German Chancellor Bethmann Hollweg had repeatedly rejected pleas from Britain and Russia to put pressure on Austria to compromise and erroneously believed the coming conflict would be contained in the Balkans. Kaiser Wilhelm II, having convinced himself that Serbia would give into Austrian demands and showed how out of touch he was by believing Serbia's acceptance of most of the ultimatum meant war would be avoided, tried on July 27 to communicate with his cousins George V of the United Kingdom and Nicholas II but with the involvement of his Foreign Ministry. The Kaiser made a direct appeal to Emperor Franz Joseph along the same lines. By 27 and 28 July, the secret partial mobilization that Russia had begun on 25 July was starting to become apparent to German intelligence assets, and the official line from St. Petersburg that it was necessary to "safeguard peace by the demonstration of force" was about to collapse. Indeed, a Tsarist Russian general in 1921 who was looking back opined that by July 24 and 25, "the war was already a decided thing, and all the floods of telegrams between the governments of Russia and Germany were nothing but the staging for an historical drama".

German decision-makers came to the conclusion that Russia would not risk war to defend Serbia. Kaiser Wilhelm II of Germany was consistent in his belief that the assassination of the heir to Franz Joseph's throne would be seen as an outrage that must be punished. He told a naval aide on July 6 of 1914 that "he did not believe there would be any further military complications" and "the Tsar would not in this case place himself on the side of the regicides. Besides, Russian and France were not prepared for war".

More traditional historiography, as well as proponents of the Fischer School, places German militarism as the principal motor of the state of war since the German military had its own line of communication to the Austrian military, and insisted on rapid mobilization against Russia. There is a curious lack of examination of the actual actions of the Russian government, first in secretly attempting a "partial mobilization" from July 24 to 29 and then being the first power to begin a true "general mobilization" on the evening of July 29. The next day, Moltke, the German Chief of Staff, sent an emotional telegram to Austrian Chief of Staff Conrad on July 30: "Austria-Hungary must be preserved, mobilize at once against Russia. Germany will mobilise".

== Invading Serbia ==
Conrad and his admirers took special pride in his elaborate war plans that were designed individually against various possible opponents but did not take into account having to fight a two-front war against Russia and Serbia simultaneously. His plans were kept secret from his own diplomatic and political leadership. He promised his secret operations would bring quick victory. Conrad assumed far more soldiers would be available, with much better training. The Austrian army had not been experienced a real war since 1866. By contrast, the Russian and Serbian armies had extensive up-to-date wartime experience in the previous decade. In practice, Conrad's soldiers were inferior to the enemy's, and his plans were riddled with flawed assumptions. His plans were based on railroad timetables from the 1870s and ignored German warnings that Russia had much improved its own railroad capabilities. He assumed the war would result in victory in six weeks. He assumed it would take Russia 30 days to mobilize its troops and that his own armies could be operational against Serbia in two weeks. When the war started, there were repeated delays, which were made worse when Conrad radically changed plans in the middle of mobilization. Russia did much better than expected by mobilizing two thirds of its army within 18 days, and operating 362 trains a day, compared to 153 trains a day by Austria-Hungary.

When he was finally ready, Conrad sent his army south into Serbia on 12 August, where it was decisively defeated with the loss of 100,000 soldiers. On 22 August, he launched an even larger campaign to the east against Russia through Galicia, which led to catastrophic defeats in the loss of 500,000 Austro-Hungarian soldiers. He blamed his railroad experts.

== Role and responsibility ==
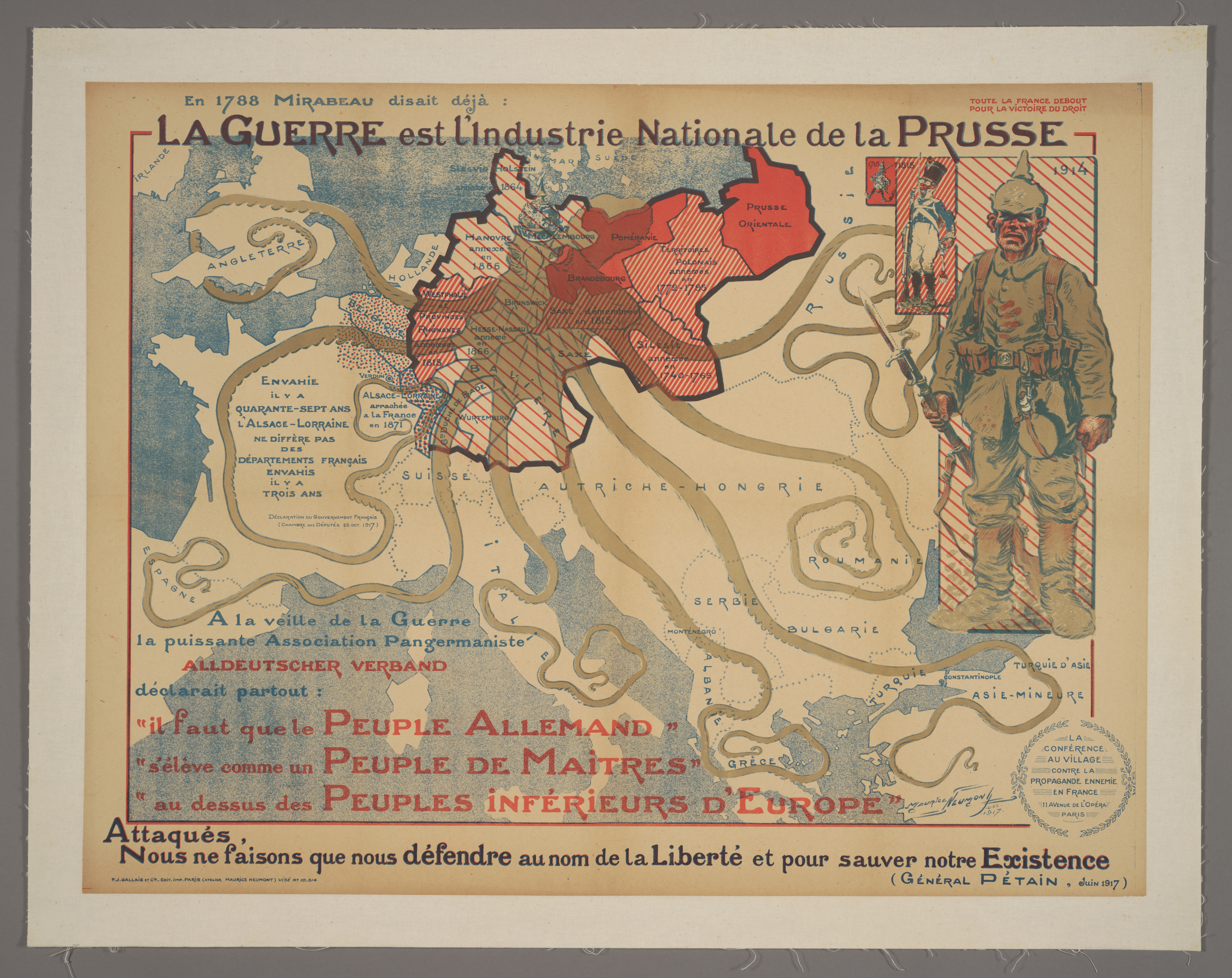
A French propaganda poster from 1917 portrays Prussia as an octopus stretching out its tentacles vying for control. It is captioned with an 18th-century quote: "Even in 1788, Mirabeau was saying that War is the National Industry of Prussia." The map ignores the Austro-Hungarian role.

Austria was not ready for a large-scale war and never planned on joining one at its onset. Its war plans assumed a swift limited invasion of Serbia and perhaps also a "defensive" war against Russia, which it had little chance to defeat unless Germany joined in, as Berlin had promised to do.

The first round of scholarship from the 1920s to the 1950s emphasized Austria's basic responsibility for launching the world war by its ultimatum to Serbia. In the 1960s, the German historian Fritz Fischer radically shifted the terms of the debate. While not denying Austria's responsibility, he shifted the primary blame to Germany for its longtime goal of controlling most of Europe. According to Fischer, the reason for that goal was to suppress growing internal dissent inside Germany. In the 1960s and the 1970s historians briefly summarized Vienna's actions.

Samuel Williamson in 1983 returned to an emphasis of the centrality of Vienna's decisions. He says that Austria's policy was not timid or indicative of second-rate power pushed forward by Berlin. Austria acted like a great power making its own decisions based on its plan to dominate the Balkan region and hurl back the Serbian challenge.

Even those who emphasize Vienna's strategic dilemma, facing activity that would be intolerable to any sovereign state now or then ("Before World War I, Serbia financed and armed Serbs within the Austrian Empire", also point to Berlin's infamous "blank check" in early July that finally licensed "Austria-Hungary's mad determination to destroy Serbia in 1914" as central to the ensuing catastrophe. Still other studies maintain that Russian and French eagerness for war has been overly discounted, along with errors made by all the principal decision-makers: "The war was a tragedy, not a crime." (Clark's "The Sleepwalkers").

Even though some Austrian politicians embraced responsibility after the defeat ("We started the war, not the Germans, and even less the Entente"), some contemporary historians have broken entirely with the conventional explanation of Austrian responsibility by finding that Russian and French encouragement of Serbia's provocative policies vis-à-vis Austria-Hungary were part of a knowing desire for war by Russia and its French ally. According to the Irish historian Sean McMeekin, "As indicated by their earlier mobilizations (especially Russia's) in 1914, France and Russia were far more eager to fight than was Germany — and far, far more than Austria-Hungary, if in her case we mean fighting Russia, not Serbia".

== See also ==
- Causes of World War I
- July Crisis
- Diplomatic history of World War I
  - Color book
  - American entry into World War I
  - French entry into World War I
  - German entry into World War I
  - Italian entry into World War I
  - Russian entry into World War I
  - Historiography of the causes of World War I
- International relations of the Great Powers (1814–1919)
