= Obljaj =

- Village
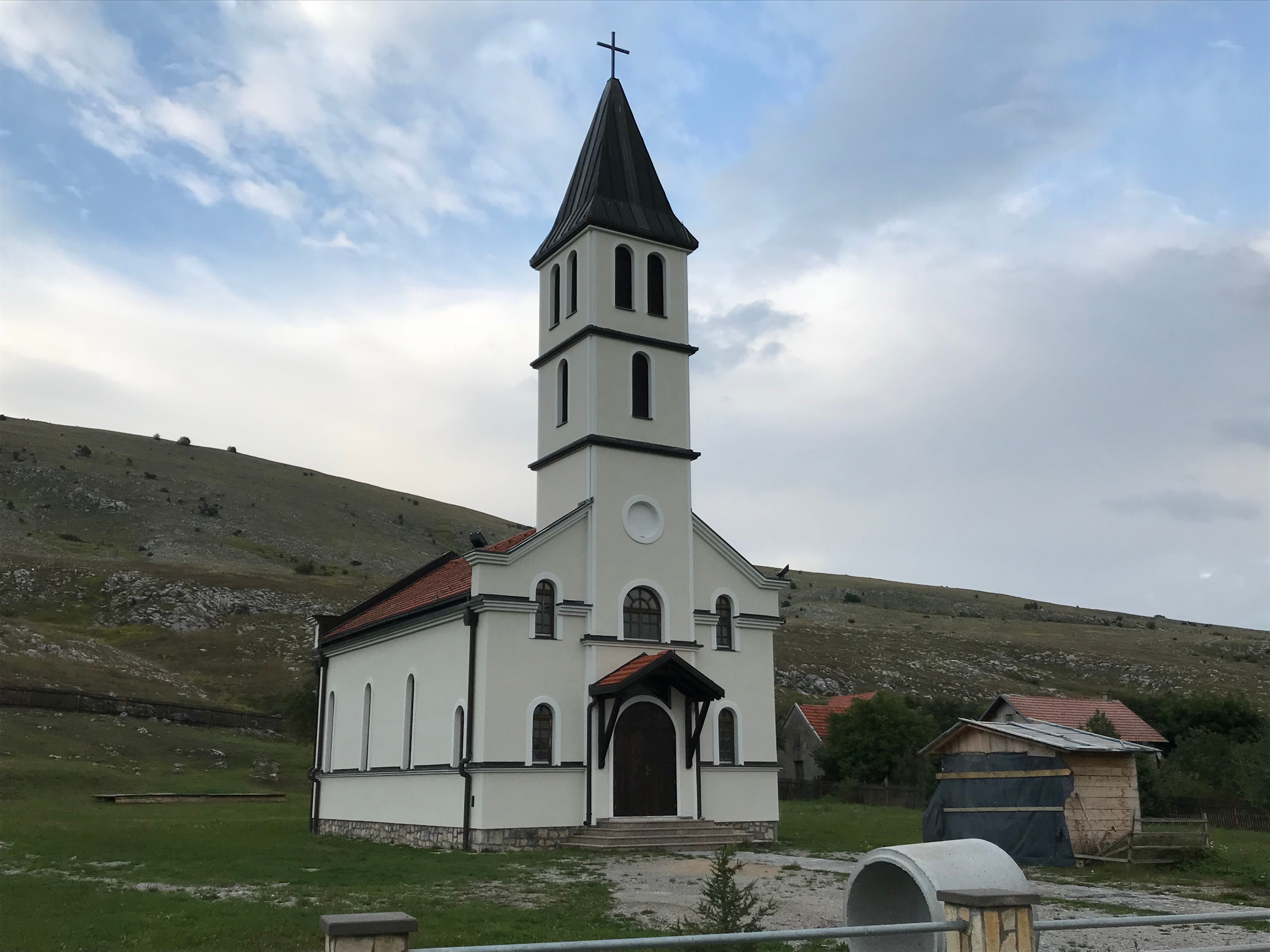
- A Catholic church in Obljaj
- Interactive map of Obljaj
- Location within Bosnia and Herzegovina
- Coordinates: 44°10′42″N 16°23′19″E
- Country: Bosnia and Herzegovina
- Entity: Federation of Bosnia and Herzegovina
- Canton: Canton 10
- Municipality: Bosansko Grahovo

Area
  - Total: 8.59 km^{2} (3.32 sq mi)

Population (2013)
  - Total: 108
  - Density: 12.6/km^{2} (32.6/sq mi)
- Time zone: UTC+1 (CET)
  - Summer (DST): UTC+2 (CEST)

Obljaj is a village in the Municipality of Bosansko Grahovo in Canton 10 of the Federation of Bosnia and Herzegovina, an entity of Bosnia and Herzegovina.

Gavrilo Princip (who assassinated Archduke Franz Ferdinand of Austria), was born here in 1894 and lived here when he was young. During the Operation Summer '95, the house in which Princip was born was burned down by Croatian forces.

== Demographics ==
According to the 2013 census, its population was 108.

Ethnicity in 2013
Ethnicity	Number	Percentage
Serbs	55	50.9%
Croats	52	48.1%
other/undeclared	1	0.9%
Total	108	100%

== Bibliography ==
- Ethnicity/National Affiliation, Religion and Mother Tongue (PDF). Sarajevo: Agency for Statistics of Bosnia and Herzegovina. 2019.
- Doak, Robin S. (2008). Assassination at Sarajevo: The Spark That Started World War I. Minneapolis, Minnesota: Compass Point Books. ISBN 9780756538576.
