= To my peoples =

Austro-Hungarian entry into World War I

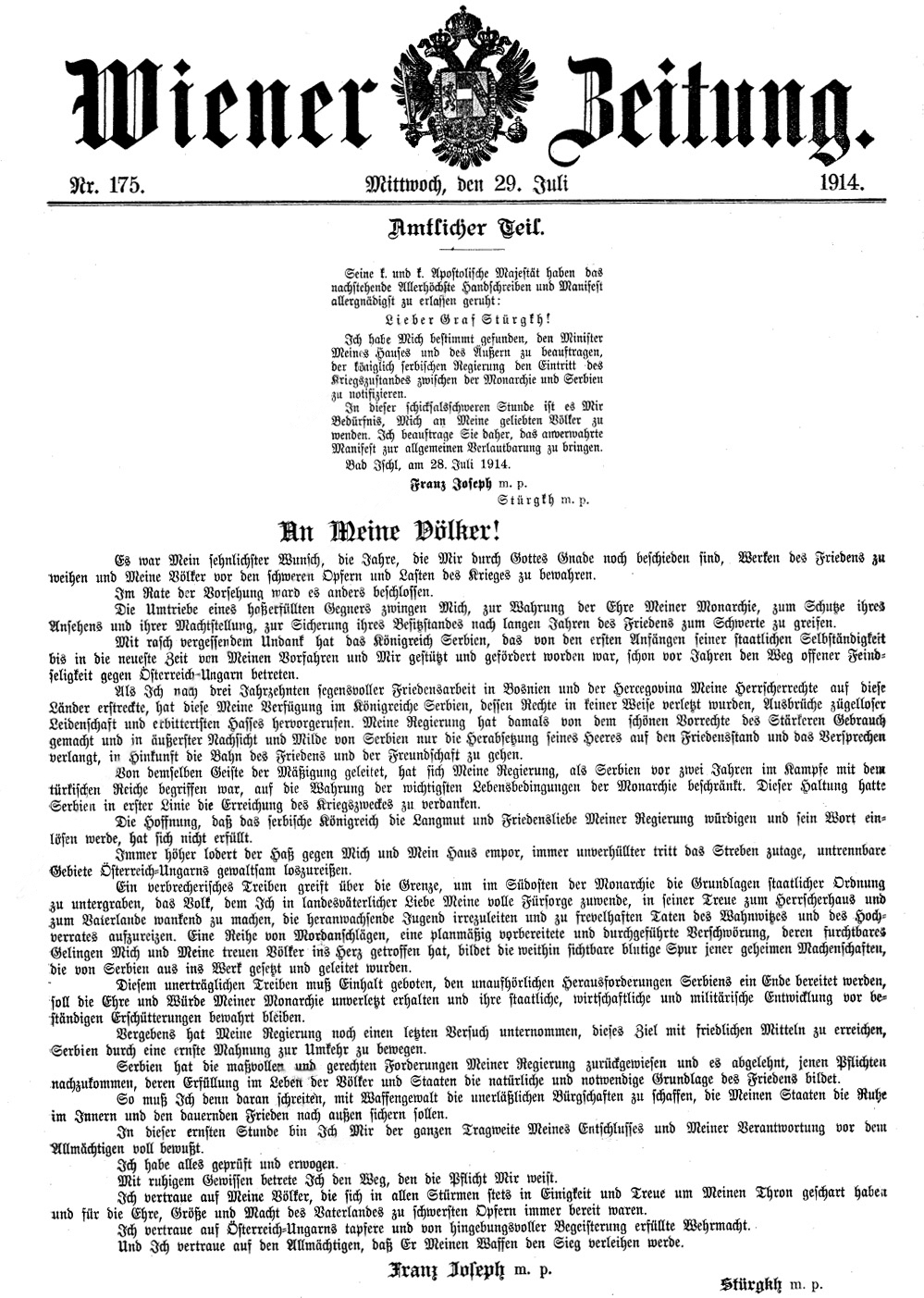
German (left) and Czech (right) translation of the manifest.

To my peoples! (German: An Meine Völker!, Hungarian: Népeimhez!, Czech: Mým národům!, Slovene: Mojim narodom!, Italian: Ai miei popoli!) was a manifesto signed by Emperor Franz Joseph I of Austria-Hungary in Bad Ischl on July 28, 1914. The text announced the Austro-Hungarian entry into World War I and the declaration of war on Serbia, starting World War I.

== Background ==
"To my people" was a typical headline of war manifestoes; it was used by Prussia upon its entry into the Sixth Coalition against Napoleon in 1813, in the Austrian declaration of war on Prussia in 1866, and in the announcement of the Italian entry into World War I against Austria-Hungary in 1915. Because Austria-Hungary was a multi-ethnic empire, "people" was made plural.

After the Assassination of Archduke Franz Ferdinand, heir to the Austro-Hungarian throne, and his wife Sophie in Sarajevo, Bosnia and Herzegovina, on June 28, 1914, diplomatic relations between Austria-Hungary and Serbia became strained. After weeks of discussions, government and army leaders of Austria-Hungary decided to risk war with Serbia, hoping for a short and victorious campaign.

Emperor Franz Joseph signed the declaration of war in his Imperial Villa in Bad Ischl on July 28. The document was distributed all over the empire and was widely published on the morning of the next day. At this time, several European countries had already started to mobilize their armies.

The text presents the aggressiveness of Serbia as the reason for the war, claiming that Austria-Hungary had tried all the ways to avoid the conflict. The document was signed by Franz Joseph and Karl von Stürgkh, minister-president of Austria. The belief of some that a peaceful solution could be still reached was quickly dashed – all political parties, including the Social Democrats, expressed their support for the war.

On July 29, Belgrade was bombed for the first time. On July 31, Austria-Hungary announced a general mobilization, and on August 12 the invasion of Serbia started. Other European powers entered World War I in early August.

== English translation ==
The Imperial Rescript and Manifesto.

     Ischl, July 28.

     Dear Count Stürgkh:

     I have resolved to instruct the Ministers of my Household and
     Foreign Affairs to notify the Royal Serbian Government of the
     beginning of a state of war between the Monarchy and Serbia. In
     this fateful hour I feel the need of turning to my beloved peoples.
     I command you, therefore, to publish the inclosed manifesto.

MANIFESTO.

     To my peoples! It was my fervent wish to consecrate the years
     which, by the grace of God, still remain to me, to the works of
     peace and to protect my peoples from the heavy sacrifices and
     burdens of war. Providence, in its wisdom, has otherwise decreed.
     The intrigues of a malevolent opponent compel me, in the defense of
     the honor of my Monarchy, for the protection of its dignity and its
     position as a power, for the security of its possessions, to grasp
     the sword after long years of peace.

     With a quickly forgetful ingratitude, the Kingdom of Serbia, which,
     from the first beginnings of its independence as a State until
     quite recently, had been supported and assisted by my ancestors,
     has for years trodden the path of open hostility to
     Austria-Hungary. When, after three decades of fruitful work for
     peace in Bosnia and Herzegovina, I extended my Sovereign rights to
     those lands, my decree called forth in the Kingdom of Serbia, whose
     rights were in nowise injured, outbreaks of unrestrained passion
     and the bitterest hate. My Government at that time employed the
     handsome privileges of the stronger, and with extreme consideration
     and leniency only requested Serbia to reduce her army to a peace
     footing and to promise that, for the future, she would tread the
     path of peace and friendship. Guided by the same spirit of
     moderation, my Government, when Serbia, two years ago, was
     embroiled in a struggle with the Turkish Empire, restricted its
     action to the defense of the most serious and vital interests of
     the Monarchy. It was to this attitude that Serbia primarily owed
     the attainment of the objects of that war.

     The hope that the Serbian Kingdom would appreciate the patience and
     love of peace of my Government and would keep its word has not been
     fulfilled. The flame of its hatred for myself and my house has
     blazed always higher; the design to tear from us by force
     inseparable portions of Austria-Hungary has been made manifest with
     less and less disguise. A criminal propaganda has extended over the
     frontier with the object of destroying the foundations of State
     order in the southeastern part of the monarchy; of making
     the people, to whom I, in my paternal affection, extended my full
     confidence, waver in its loyalty to the ruling house and to the
     Fatherland; of leading astray its growing youth and inciting it to
     mischievous deeds of madness and high treason. A series of
     murderous attacks, an organized, carefully prepared, and well
     carried out conspiracy, whose fruitful success wounded me and my
     loyal peoples to the heart, forms a visible bloody track of those
     secret machinations which were operated and directed in Serbia.

     A halt must be called to these intolerable proceedings and an end
     must be put to the incessant provocations of Serbia. The honor and
     dignity of my monarchy must be preserved unimpaired, and its
     political, economic, and military development must be guarded from
     these continual shocks. In vain did my Government make a last
     attempt to accomplish this object by peaceful means and to induce
     Serbia, by means of a serious warning, to desist. Serbia has
     rejected the just and moderate demands of my Government and refused
     to conform to those obligations the fulfillment of which forms the
     natural and necessary foundation of peace in the life of peoples
     and States. I must therefore proceed by force of arms to secure
     those indispensable pledges which alone can insure tranquillity to
     my States within and lasting peace without.

     In this solemn hour I am fully conscious of the whole significance
     of my resolve and my responsibility before the Almighty. I have
     examined and weighed everything, and with a serene conscience I set
     out on the path to which my duty points. I trust in my peoples,
     who, throughout every storm, have always rallied in unity and
     loyalty around my throne, and have always been prepared for the
     severest sacrifices for the honor, the greatness, and the might of
     the Fatherland. I trust in Austria-Hungary's brave and devoted
     forces, and I trust in the Almighty to give the victory to my arms.

     FRANZ JOSEPH mppria
