= Church of St. Gregory the Theologian, Tovariševo =

Church of St. Gregory the Theologian
- Црква Светог Григорија Богослова; Crkva Svetog Grigorija Bogoslova
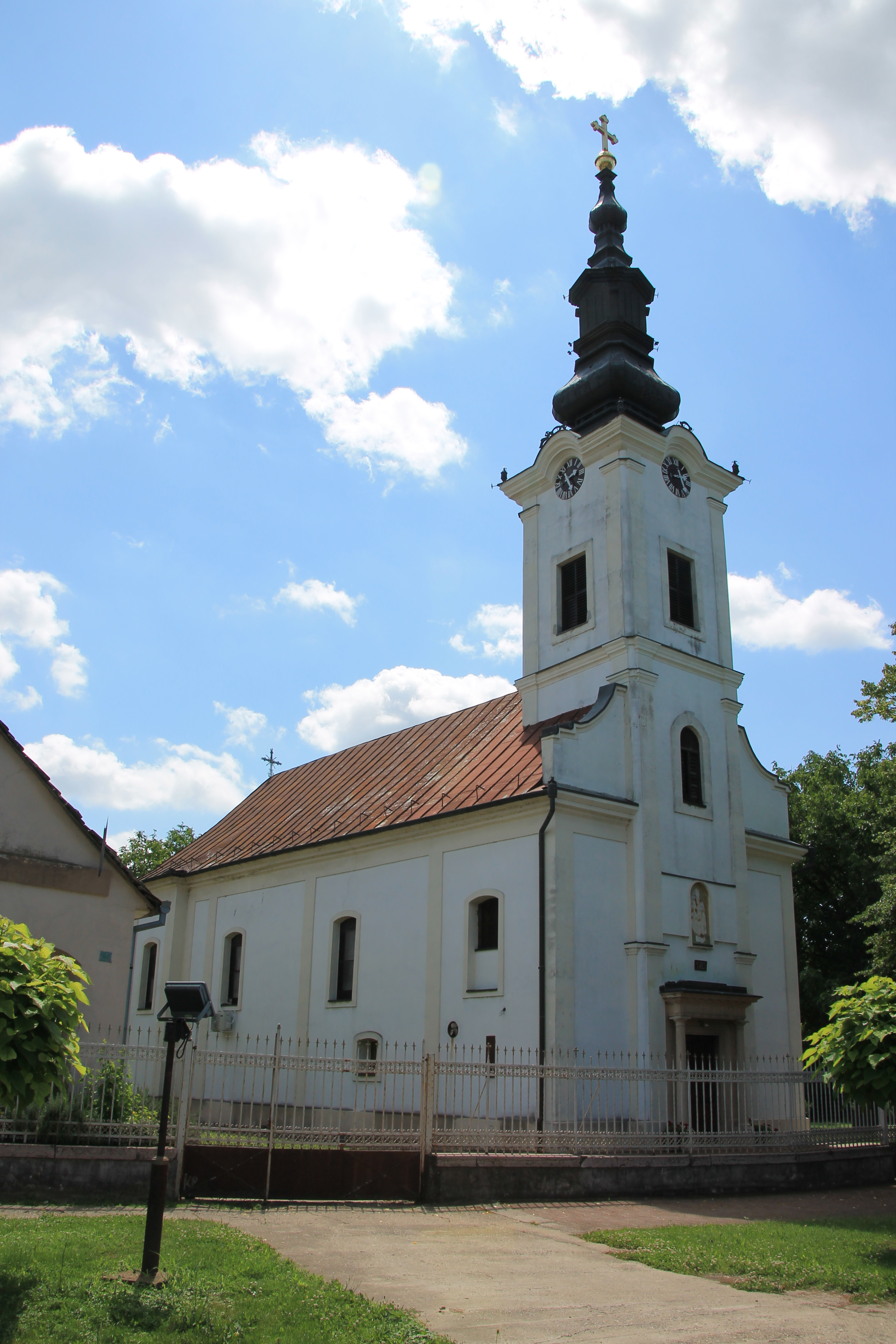
- Church of St. Gregory the Theologian
- Church of St. Gregory the Theologian
- 45°21′22″N 19°19′27″E
- Location: Tovariševo, Vojvodina
- Country: Serbia
- Denomination: Serbian Orthodox

History
- Status: Church
- Dedication: St. Gregory the Theologian

Architecture
- Functional status: Active
- Style: Neo-classicism
- Years built: 1785

Administration
- Archdiocese: Eparchy of Bačka

Cultural Heritage of Serbia
- Type: Cultural Monument of Great Importance
- Designated: 2005
- Reference no.: СК 1902

The Church of St. Gregory the Theologian (Serbian: Црква Светог Григорија Богослова) in Tovariševo is a Serbian Orthodox church in Vojvodina, Serbia. Built from 1783 to 1785, the church is dedicated to St. Gregory the Theologian and serves as the Orthodox parish church of Tovariševo. The building is a state-protected cultural monument. The church represents a typical example of Orthodox church architecture in Vojvodina from the second half of the 18th century to the first half of the 19th century, utilizing stylistic elements ranging from advanced Baroque to Classicism.

== History ==
Although it is believed that a Serbian Orthodox church existed in the village before the Great Serb Migration of 1690, the first written documents mentioning a church in the area date back to 1715, mentioning a churchman named Ilija Sremac as a resident of the village. The first written records of Serbian Orthodox priests in the village date from 1745.

The original iconostasis of the old church, most likely made before 1770, has been preserved. Today, this iconostasis is located in the village of Molovin. The church has undergone several renovations, with the last major reconstruction taking place in 1996.

== See also ==
- Eparchy of Bačka
- Church of the Nativity of the Blessed Virgin Mary, Bačka Palanka
