= Hugo Phillip Graf von Lerchenfeld auf Köfering und Schönberg =

Hugo Phillip Graf von und zu Lerchenfeld auf Köfering und Schönberg
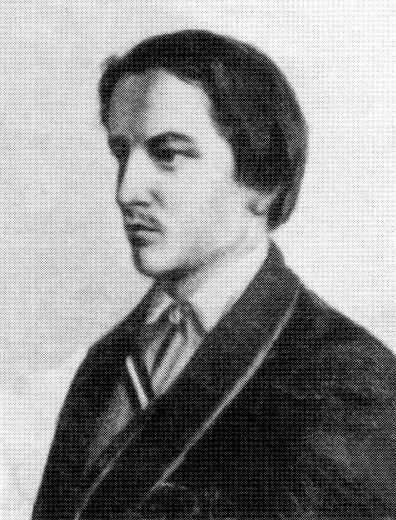
- Hugo von Lerchenfeld-Köfering (1843-1925)

Bavarian representative to Prussia
- In office 1880–1918

Personal details
- Born: October 13, 1843 Berlin
- Died: June 28, 1925 Köfering
- Occupation: Diplomat

Hugo Phillip Graf von Lerchenfeld auf Köfering und Schönberg (13 October 1843, in Berlin – 28 June 1925, in Köfering) was the representative of the Kingdom of Bavaria in Berlin from 1880 to 1918.

Due to the dual nature of the King of Prussia also being the German Emperor in those years, in practice he functioned as the Bavarian representative to the national German government. He also served in this time as one of the six Bavarian delegates to the Bundesrat, the second chamber of the national parliament.

== Life ==
Hugo Phillip Graf von Lerchenfeld was born on 13 October 1843 in Berlin, his parents being Max Graf von Lerchenfeld and Isabella Gräfin Waldbott von Bassenheim. He studied law and joined the Bavarian foreign department in 1868.

Like his father he became a member of the Bavarian diplomatic corps, serving at first in Paris in 1868. He briefly held a post at the foreign ministry in Munich before serving abroad again, from 1871 in St. Petersburg. From 1875 he was posted in Vienna and after this he served for 41 years as the Bavarian representative in Berlin.

On 21 December 1899, he was made an honorary member of the Prussian Academy of Sciences. In 1911, he became a Knight of the Hubertusorden.

He died on 28 June 1925 in Köfering, near Regensburg.
