= Luka Jukić =

Bosnian Croat nationalist

- Jukić, 1912
- Born: 23 February 1887; Donji Svilaj, Austria-Hungary (present-day Bosnia and Herzegovina)
- Died: 24 June 1929 (aged 42); Slavonski Brod, Kingdom of Yugoslavia
- Citizenship: Austro-Hungarian (later Kingdom of SCS)
- Occupations: Student, revolutionary
- Political party: Radical nationalist youth movement / Progressive youth
- Children: 3

Notes
- Sentenced to death (commuted to life imprisonment); served time in Lepoglava prison until his 1918 amnesty

Luka Jukić was a Bosnian Croat nationalist and student who was a prominent figure in the anti-Habsburg revolutionary youth movement in the years leading up to World War I.

== Early life and education ==
Jukić was born in Donji Svilaj (near Odžak in present-day Bosnia and Herzegovina). He attended gymnasiums (high schools) in Travnik, Tuzla, and eventually graduated in Sarajevo in 1907. He relocated to Zagreb to study law. Initially, during his early university years, he aligned with right-wing or nationalist student circles (such as Frankist youth groups), but his political worldview gradually shifted toward radical revolutionary South Slavic (Yugoslav) nationalism.

== 1912 assassination attempt ==
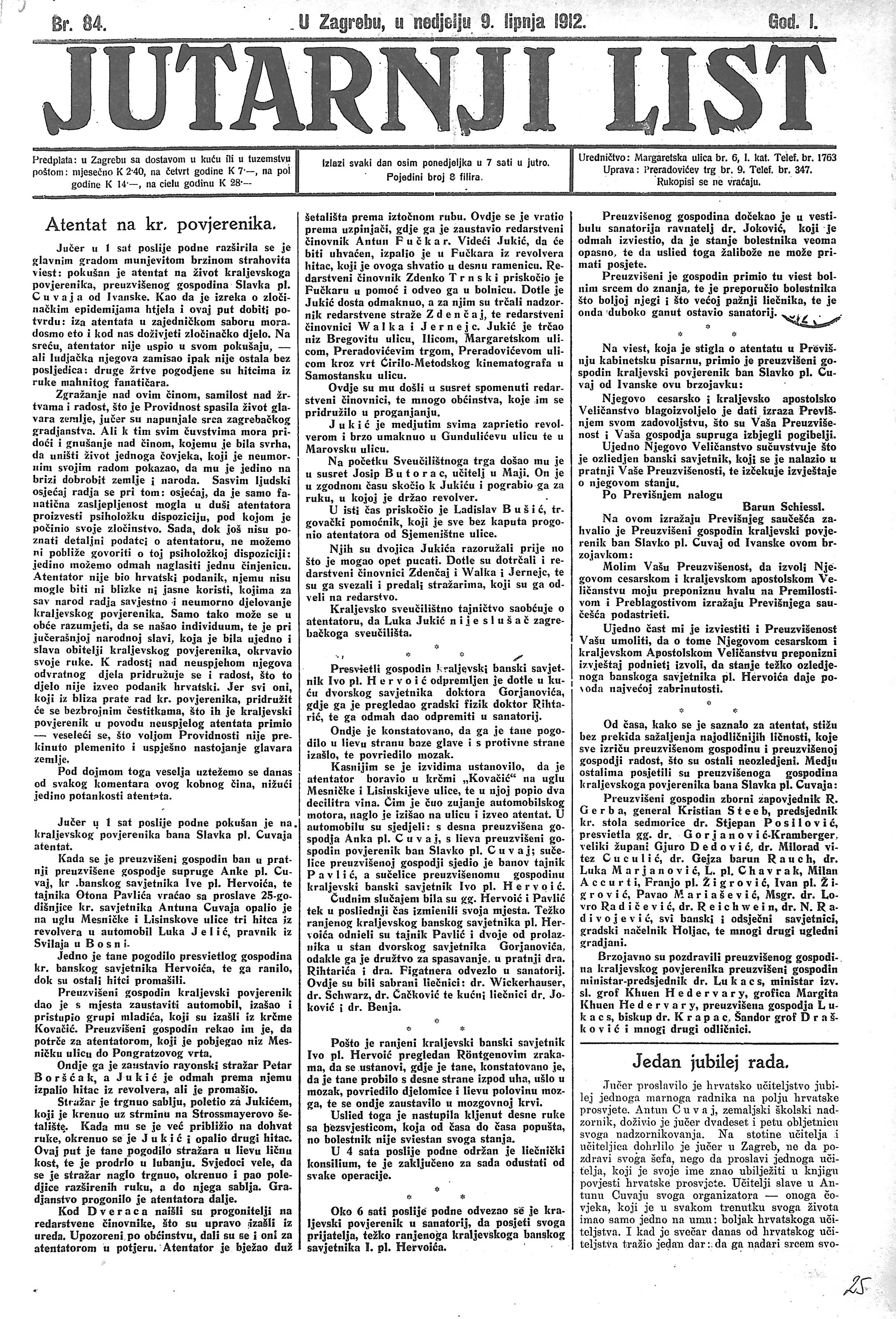
The newspaper Jutarnji list (1912) on the unsuccessful assassination attempt on the Commissioner of Croatia, Ban Slavko Cuvaj in 1912.

On June 8, 1912, Jukić carried out an unsuccessful assassination attempt against Slavko Cuvaj, the Austro-Hungarian royal commissioner (Ban) of Croatia, in Zagreb.

Cuvaj had suspended the Croatian constitution and clamped down heavily on civil liberties and political opposition. Jukić, inspired by radical nationalist and Yugoslav/South Slavic liberation ideas, sought to strike a blow against Austro-Hungarian rule.

The shooting failed to kill Cuvaj (though it wounded a member of his entourage), and Jukić was arrested. He was sentenced to death, though his sentence was later commuted to long-term imprisonment. During his trial and imprisonment, authorities and court-appointed psychiatrists heavily scrutinized his mental state, a tactic often used at the time to frame political dissent and revolutionary radicalism as mental illness.

== Legacy ==
Jukić attack was part of a broader wave of revolutionary student radicalism in the Balkans during the early 1910s, such as acts carried out by groups like Mlada Bosna (Young Bosnia), that ultimately created the volatile political climate leading directly to the 1914 Sarajevo assassination of Archduke Franz Ferdinand.
