= Tovariševo =

Tovariševo Товаришево (Serbian)
- Village (Selo)
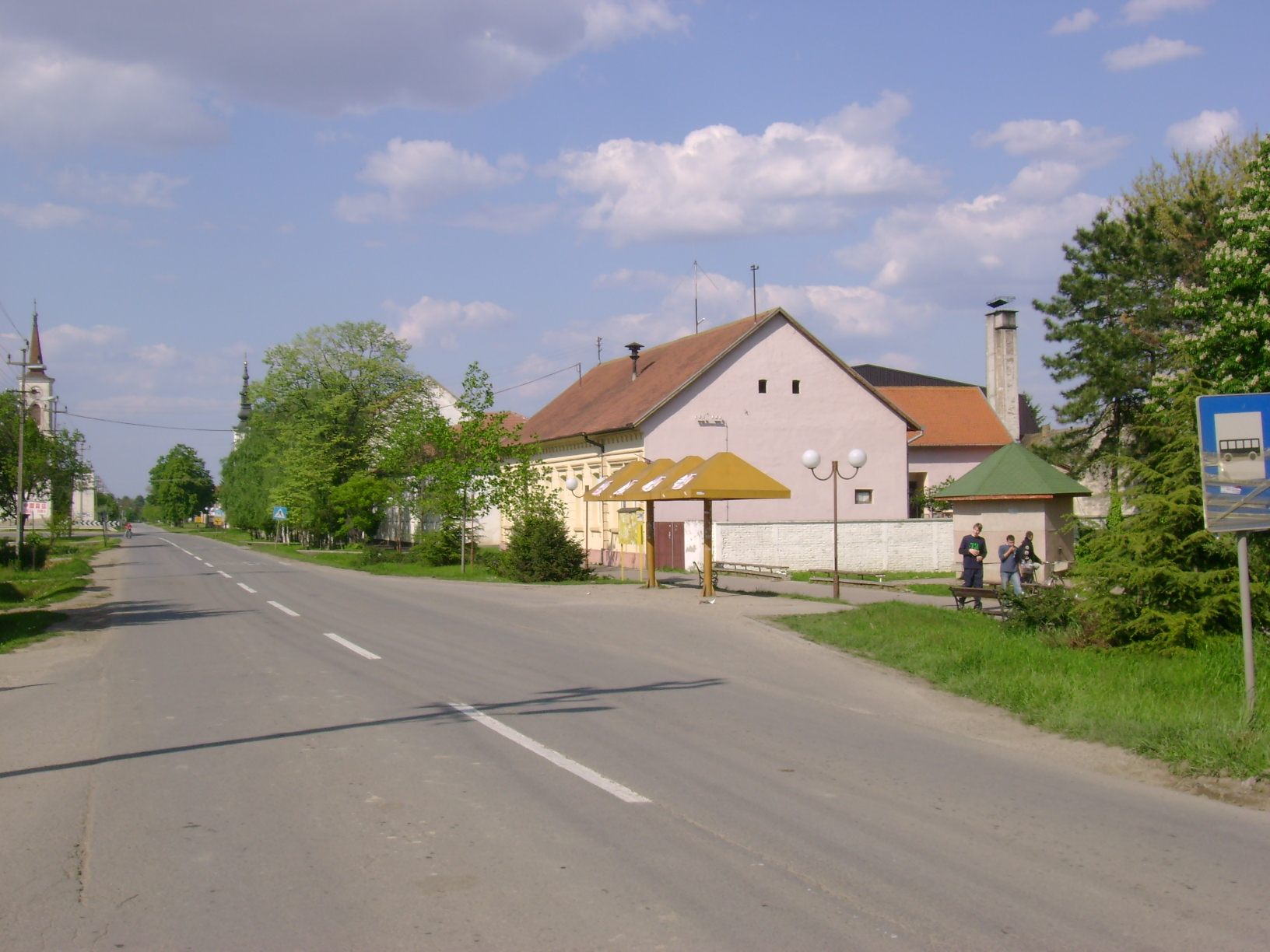
- Main street and village center

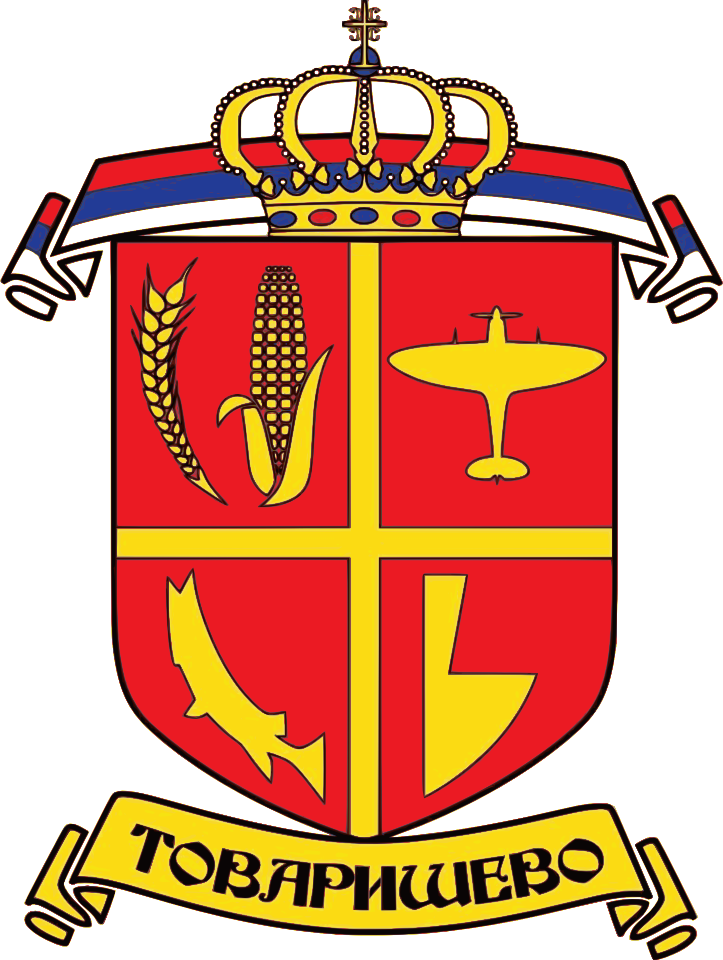
- Seal

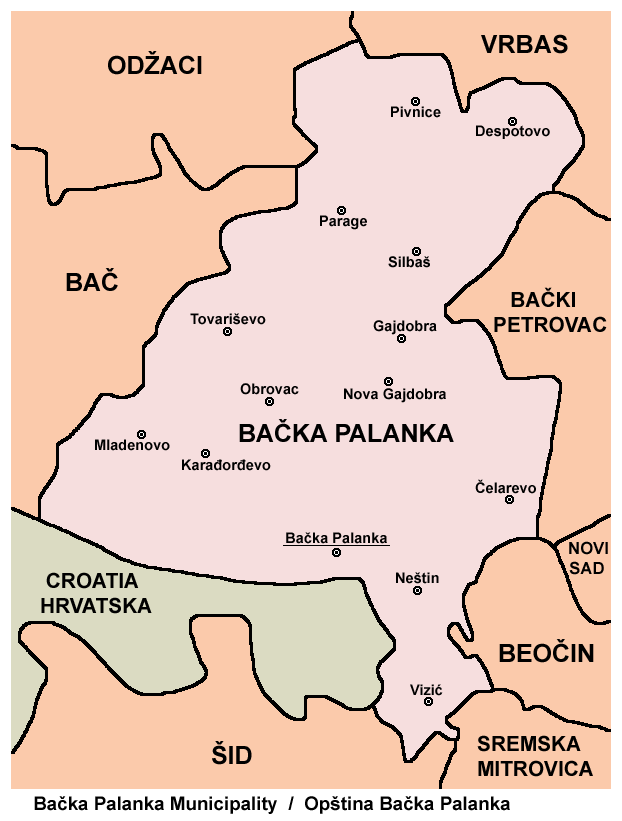
- Map of the Bačka Palanka municipality, showing the location of Tovariševo

- Location within Vojvodina Location within Serbia Location within Europe
- Coordinates: 45°21′N 19°19′E
- Country: Serbia
- Province: Vojvodina
- Region: Bačka (Podunavlje)
- District: South Bačka
- Municipality: Bačka Palanka

Population (2022)
  - Total: 2,321
- Time zone: UTC+1 (CET)
  - Summer (DST): UTC+2 (CEST)

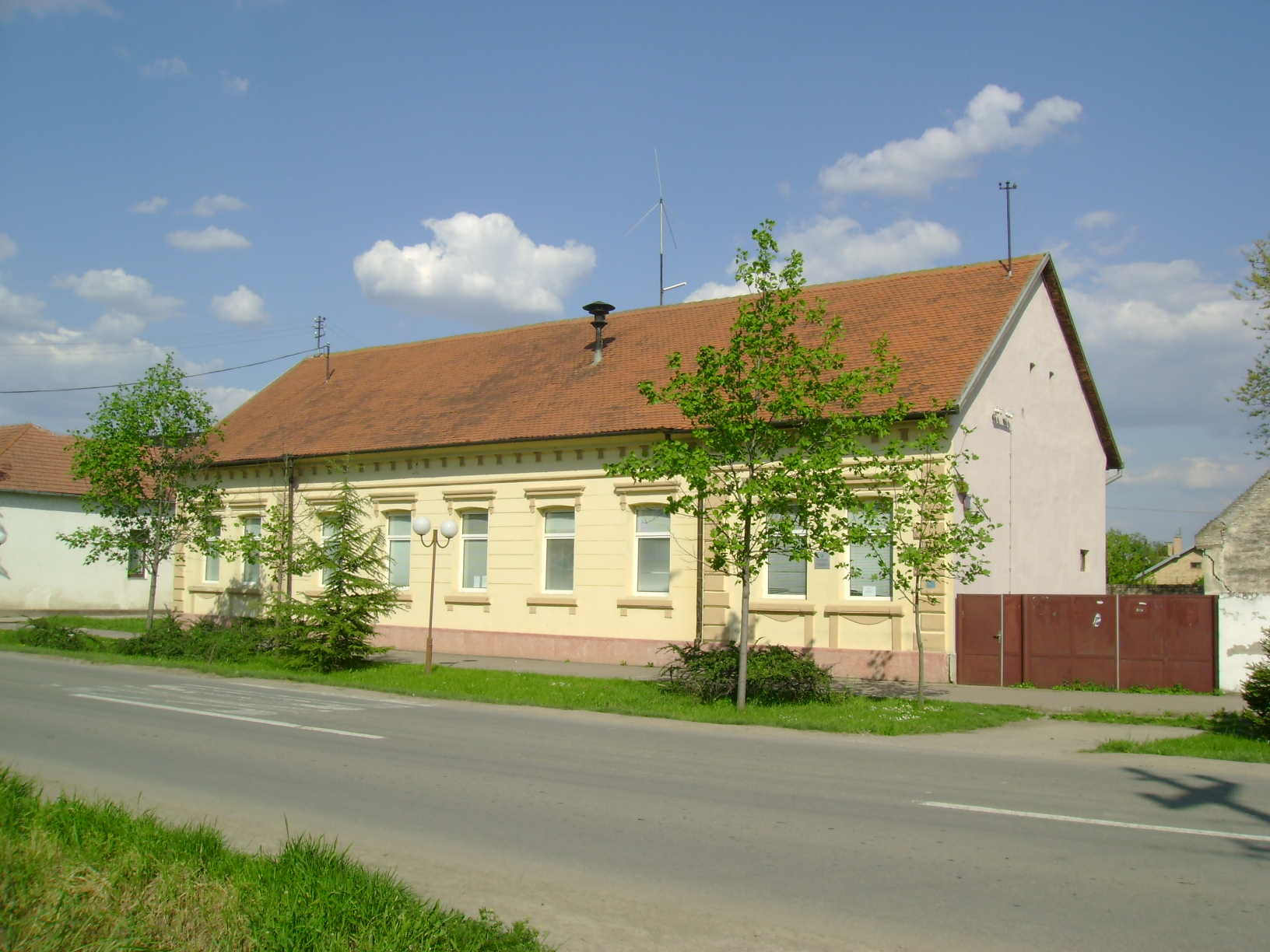
Local community office

Tovariševo (Serbian Cyrillic: Товаришево) is a village in Serbia, in the Autonomous Province of Vojvodina. The village has a Serb ethnic majority and its population numbering 2,321 people (2022 census).

== Name ==
In Serbian, the village is known as Tovariševo or Товаришево, in German as Towarisch, in Hungarian as Bácstóváros (or former Tovarisova), and in Croatian as Tovariševo.

== Geography ==
Tovariševo is located in the South Bačka District. Administratively it belongs to the municipality of Bačka Palanka.

== History ==
Tovariševo is one of the old Serb communities of Vojvodina, first mentioned in 1543, during Ottoman administration. It administratively was part of the Ottoman Sanjak of Segedin. In the end of the 17th century, the village was abandoned, but was repopulated in the beginning of the 18th century, during Habsburg administration. A description from the end of the 18th century (by András Vályi) states that "Tovarisova is a Rac (Serb) village in Bács county. The landowner is the Royal Hungarian Chamber and the population follows the old faith (i.e. Orthodox). The black soil gives wheat, barley and oats, the village has an oak forest and a bad vineyard; it hasn't any water, but after the long autumn rains the soil became sodden; it lacks reed but it has silk-beetles. The nearest market-town is Újvidék (Novi Sad), where people can earn money from the sale of cattle."

Until 1848, the village was part of the Batsch-Bodrog County within the Habsburg Kingdom of Hungary. In 1848-1849 it was part of autonomous Serbian Vojvodina, while from 1849 to 1860, it was part of the Voivodeship of Serbia and Banat of Temeschwar, which was a separate Habsburg crownland. After abolishment of the voivodeship, in 1860, the village was again included into Batsch-Bodrog County.

In 1787 population of the village numbered 1,490 inhabitants, while until the middle of the 19th century number of inhabitants was enlarged to 2,945. After 1843, a German minority settled in the village next to the Serbs, and they built a big Roman Catholic church dedicated to Saint Charles Borromeo in 1882. The population of Tovariševo was 3,439 (2,281 Serbs and 844 Germans) in 1880.

Since 1918, the village is part of the Kingdom of Serbs, Croats and Slovenes (renamed to Yugoslavia in 1929). In 1921, population of the village was 3,875, mostly Serb, while 850 inhabitants were Germans. From 1918 to 1922, the village was part of Novi Sad county, from 1922 to 1929 part of Bačka Oblast, and from 1929 to 1941 part of Danube Banovina. During the Second World War, from 1941 to 1944, the village was under Axis occupation and was attached to Horthy's Hungary.

In 1944, Soviet Red Army and Yugoslav partisans expelled Axis troops from the region and village became part of the new socialist Yugoslavia. Local German population mostly fled from the area together with defeated German Army. Since 1944, the village is part of the autonomous province of Vojvodina, which in 1945 was included into People's Republic of Serbia within Yugoslavia.

== Demographics ==
In 2002, the population of the village numbered 3,102 people, including 2,583 Serbs, 278 Roma, and others.

== Historical population ==
- 1961: 3,581
- 1971: 3,381
- 1981: 3,297
- 1991: 3,043
- 2002: 3,102
- 2011: 2,657
- 2022: 2,321

== Sights ==
In the middle of the village stands the baroque Serb-Orthodox Church, dedicated to Saint Gregory the Theologian (Bogoslov) and the Roman Catholic Church. The latter is almost derelict because today it has only a weak Croatian and Hungarian congregation.

== Gallery ==
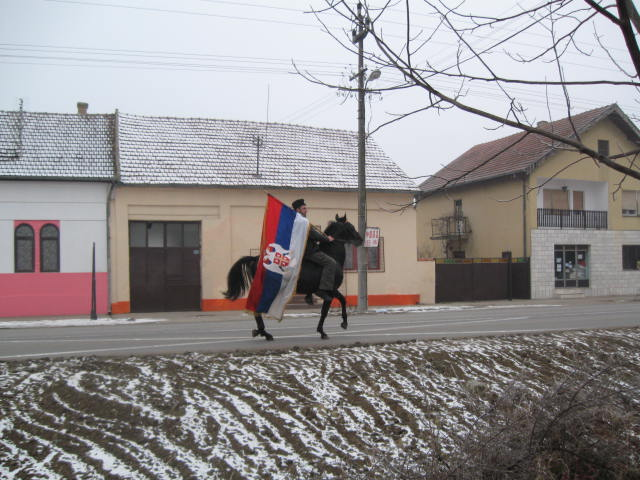
Serb Christmas costumes

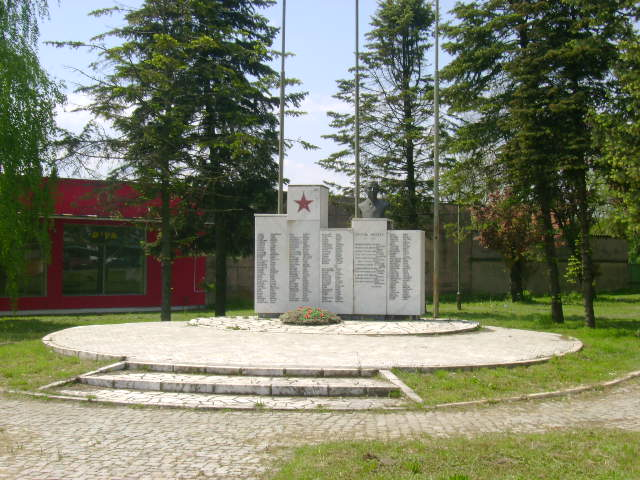
WW2 memorial dedicated to fallen partisan fighters and victims of Axis occupation

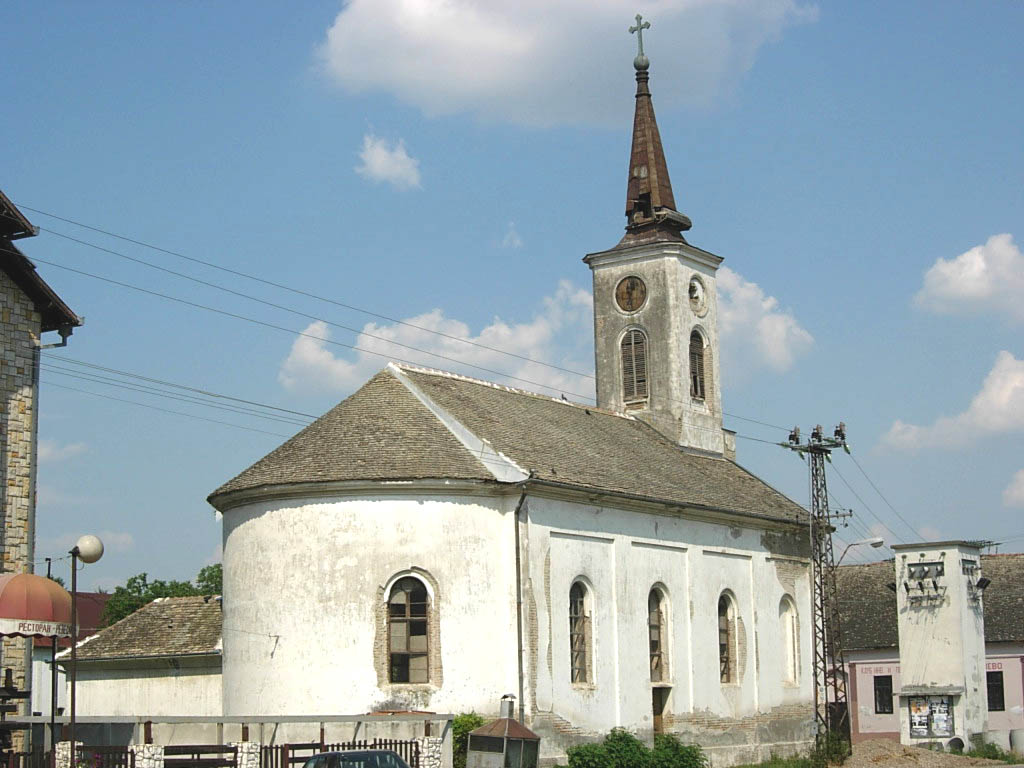
The Saint Charles Bormeian Catholic Church

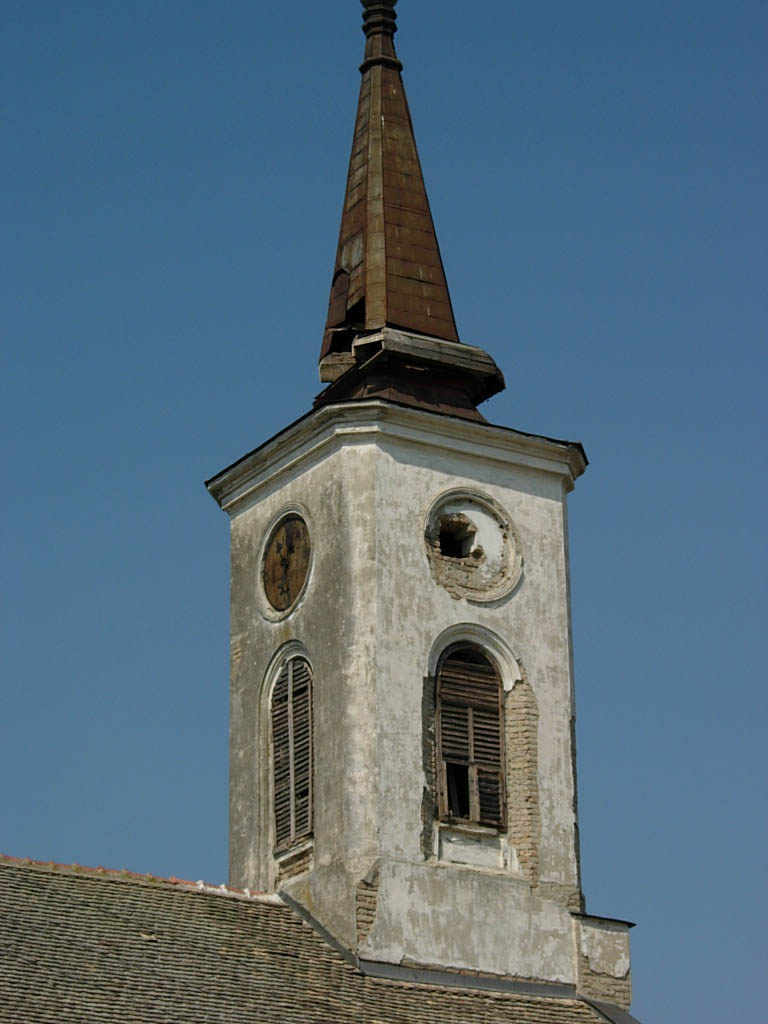
The steeple of the Catholic church

== See also ==
- Church of St. George, Tovariševo
- List of places in Serbia
- List of cities, towns and villages in Vojvodina
