= Nenad Petrović (writer) =

Nenad Petrović (Serbian Cyrillic: Ненад Петровић; 30 May 1925 – 21 March 2014) was a Serbian writer, and one of numerous displaced persons after World War II and revolution in Yugoslavia.

== Life ==
Petrović was born in 1925 in Zagreb and graduated from Belgrade's Velika škola in 1944, when he joined the national resistance movement, General Dragoljub Mihailović's loyal Chetniks, while under Axis occupation.

After withdrawing through Sandzak and Bosnia in 1944 and 1945, he became an interpreter for the Yugoslav units serving the British Army in Italy and Germany. In 1947, he came to Great Britain as a Displaced Person and first worked as a farm hand and later as an employee in an industrial concern. He studied Political Economy in London.

Petrović was active in the association Oslobodjenje (Liberation) and was a member of the editorial board of the publication, Naša Reć (Our Word) from 1958 and of the editorial board of the publishing house Naše Delo (Our Deed).

From 1963, he was secretary of the exile Committee of the Liberal International. He was a member of Democratic Alternative, founded by Desimir Tošić. He is also secretary of the Association of Serbian Writers and Artists in Exile.

Petrović was active in the work of the Serbian Orthodox Church. Under the editorship of Professor Radoje Knežević he was, from 1964 to 1974, permanent correspondent of Glas kanadskih Srba (Voice of the Canadian Serbs).

He died in London.

== Works ==
Petrović has published in English in the Review of the Study Centre for Yugoslav Affairs, articles Yugoslav Communist Party Congresses since. the War and The Fall of Alexander Rankovic and in the Serbian language, among others, articles on Dimitrije Mitrinović (1967), The Centenary of Lenin's Birth, Vladimir Gacinovic, Risto Radulovic, Peter Struve.

He has published the following books: The Two Faces of Jugoslav Communism (1963) and The Daughter of Marx (1973), a critical survey of the beginnings of Socialism in England. He has contributed to the two volumes, Democratic Jugoslavia, articles entitled: "For a new social and political morality" (1967) and "The awakening of nationalism under Communist regimes" (1972); in both editions of the selected works of the Association of Serbian Writers and Artists in Exile on: "Our literature in exile" (1973) and "The latest monograph on Hilandar" (1980). In the record of Twenty years of work and political attitudes of the Association Oslobodjenje Petrovic contributed an article entitled: "In Emigration — yet independent of it."

In Belgrade he has published: Iz života londonskih političkih emigracija (From the life of the London Political emigrants) (1998) and Ogled o smislu i zabludama (Essay on Sense and Aberrations, 2001).

His main work is his diary, which he wrote every day for 64 years. In total, there are 23,333 entries spanning from 1944 to 2008. This diary serves as a personal record and intimate story, as well as a witness account of day-to-day émigré life in Britain. It is a long and detailed chronicle of the émigré community's life in the second half of the 20th century and the beginning of the 21st century. The Diary is published in Belgrade in 2023 in five volumes as Дневници Ненада В. Петровића : од 1944. до 2009. године (Nenad V. Petrović Diaries: 1944-2009).
