= Risto Radulović =

- Born: Ристо Радуловић; 21 September 1880; Mostar, Condominium of Bosnia and Herzegovina, Austria-Hungary
- Died: 15 March 1915 (aged 34); Arad concentration camp

Risto Radulović "Rinda" (Serbian Cyrillic: Ристо Радуловић; 21 September 1880 – 15 March 1915) was a journalist and politician who promoted the English political thought and sociology in Bosnia and Herzegovina under control of Austria-Hungary.

== Family ==
The great-grandfather of Radulović decided to abandon his hard working life in Tulje near Trebinje and moved to Mostar to work as stonemason. His two sons, Jovo and Lazo started trading business and established trading connections with Trieste. Their descendants continued trading business but were also active in political and cultural life, some of them being actors in theater. Members of Radulović's family participated in the uprisings of 1875 and 1882 so Radulović was brought up as an enemy of Austria-Hungary.

== Editorial work ==
In 1897 Radulović was an editor of the school paper "Serbdom" (Serbian: Српство) published since Summer of 1896 by the "Serb consciousness" (Serbian: Српска свијест), а secret students' society of the Gymnasium in Mostar established in Autumn of 1895. In 1897 Radulović was the first student who was expelled from Mostar school.

At the beginning of 1907 a group of Serb intellectuals in Mostar began publishing of the journal "People" (Serbian: Народ) which was edited by Radulović. Radulović closely collaborated with Aleksa Šantić, Svetozar Ćorović, Atanasije Šola and other notable Mostar intellectuals, and was also very active in Gusle Singing Society.

Radulović was an editor of the journal "Pregled" since August 1910. In his texts Radulović expressed his affinity toward Yugoslavism, as a way to overcome destructive national antagonisms.

== Young Bosnia ==
Bogdan Žerajić decided to assassinate General Marijan Varešanin, the Governor of Bosnia and Herzegovina, after he read an article written by Risto Radulović, who argued against dispiritedness in the public life of Bosnia and Herzegovina. In his article, Radulović explained that he did not see glorious moments of the nation nor a single tragedy which he believed was necessary to temper the struggle. When Žerajić read these words he yelled "There will be a tragedy!".

Radulović was the central figure of anti occupational movement before the assassination of Archduke Franz Ferdinand of Austria Members of Young Bosnia followed his political course. Still, he disagreed with their glorification of the peasantry. He believed that authentic nationalism is cultural phenomenon connected with educated people in enlightened civic societies.

Radulović belonged to large group of notable Serbs who were imprisoned after the assassination. Radulović was first imprisoned in Tuzla until the end of December 1914 when he was moved to Arad concentration camp where he met his father and died there on 15 March 1915. In 1922 his remnants were transferred from Arad to Mostar.

== Sources ==
- Ćorović, Svetozar (1967). Sabrana djela: Život i djelo Svetozara Corovića. Svjedočanstva. Prepiska. Svjetlost.
- Radulović, Risto (1940). Rasprave i članci. Srpska književna zadruga.
- Radulovic, Risto (1988). Izabrani radovi.
