= Vlado Gaćinović =

Vlado Gaćinović may refer to:

- Vladimir Gaćinović (1890–1917), Bosnian Serb essayist and revolutionary
- Vladimir Gaćinović (footballer) (born 1966), Serbian football manager and former player
