= Gornje Dubovo =

- Village
- Interactive map of Gornje Dubovo
- Location within Bosnia and Herzegovina
- Coordinates: 43°50′N 19°21′E
- Country: Bosnia and Herzegovina
- Entity: Republika Srpska
- Municipality: Višegrad
- Time zone: UTC+1 (CET)
  - Summer (DST): UTC+2 (CEST)

Gornje Dubovo (Serbian: Горње Дубово) is a village in the municipality of Višegrad, Bosnia and Herzegovina.

== Notable people ==
- Višnja Mosić (1870–1937), war heroine during WWI
