= Gaćinović =

Gaćinović (Serbian Cyrillic: Гаћиновић, pronounced [ɡatɕǐːnoʋitɕ]; is a Serbian surname.

Notable people with the surname include:

- Vladimir Gaćinović (1890–1917), Bosnian Serb writer and revolutionary
- Vladimir Gaćinović (born 1966), Bosnian Serb footballer and coach

- his son Mijat Gaćinović (born 1995), Serbian professional footballer
