= Mustafa Golubić =

Bosnian Chetnik, revolutionary and intelligence agent

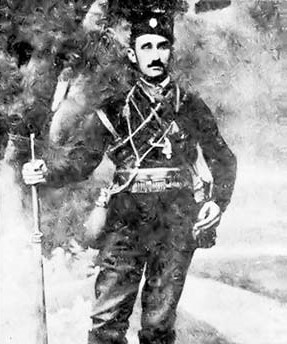
- Born: Mustafa Golubić; 24 October 1889/24 January 1891; Stolac, Condominium of Bosnia and Herzegovina, Austria-Hungary
- Died: July 1941; Belgrade, German-occupied Serbia
- Education: University of Belgrade
- Parent(s): Muhamed and Nura Golubić
- Awards: Medal for Bravery
- Espionage activity
- Allegiance: Kingdom of Serbia (1912–1918); Soviet Union (1923–1941)
- Service years: 1912–1918; 1923–1941
- Operations: Balkan Wars; World War I World War II

Mustafa Golubić (Serbian Cyrillic: Мустафа Голубић, Russian: Мустафа Голубич; 24 October 1889/24 January 1891 – July 1941) was a Serbian and Yugoslav revolutionary, guerrilla fighter and intelligence agent active from the Balkan Wars to World War II

As a youth, Golubić was a member of the Bosnian separatist group Young Bosnia. After the outbreak of the Balkan Wars, he joined the Chetniks of Vojislav Tankosić. During World War I, he served in the Royal Serbian Army and later visited Russia to gather recruits for the Balkan Front. After Serbia was overrun by the Central Powers in late-1915, Golubić retreated to the Greek island of Corfu alongside the rest of the Royal Serbian Army, where he began plotting to assassinate Kaiser Wilhelm II with the apparent blessing of Dragutin Dimitrijević, the head of Serbian military intelligence.

After travelling to France for the purpose of carrying out the plan, Golubić was arrested by the French authorities and deported to Corfu, where he was asked to testify against Dimitrijević, who had since been detained on charges of plotting against the Serbian Crown Prince, Alexander I. Despite undergoing torture, Golubić refused to testify and was released. He subsequently relocated to France, where he spent the rest of the war.

In 1920, after allegedly making death threats against Alexander, he relocated to Vienna, where in 1923, he began writing for a Soviet-linked publication. He later moved to Moscow in 1927 and was recruited by the Soviets as an agent and carried out assassinations of Soviet adversaries abroad on behalf of the NKVD. In 1941, Golubić returned to Yugoslavia on a secret assignment. Following the Axis invasion and occupation of the country, he was arrested by the Gestapo and eventually killed after refusing to disclose sensitive information under torture.

== Biography ==
=== Balkan Wars and World War I ===
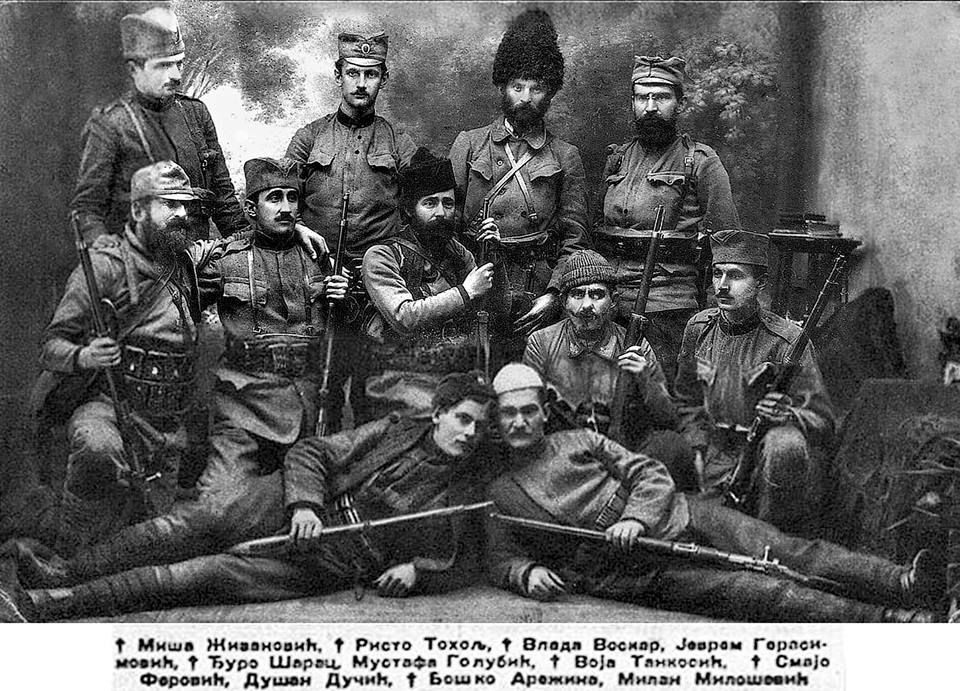
The Chetniks of Vojislav Tankosić pose for a group photo during the Balkan Wars; Golubić can be seen in the middle row, second from left.

Mustafa Golubić was born in the town of Stolac, in southwestern Herzegovina. His birth date varies by source. By some accounts, he was born on 24 October 1889. Other sources list his birth date as 24 January 1891. His father, Muhamed, was a craftsman and his mother, Nura, was a homemaker. His family was Bosnian Muslim. Golubić self-identified as a Muslim Serb.

Golubić completed his primary education in Stolac, before relocating to Sarajevo to attend high school. In 1908, following the Austro-Hungarian annexation of Bosnia-Herzegovina, he moved to Belgrade for post-secondary studies, studying law at the University of Belgrade. Some of Golubić's classmates and contemporaries later recounted that Golubić was recruited by the Russian secret police, the Okhrana, in his youth. The historian Vladimir Dedijer later consulted the records of the Hoover Institution in an attempt to verify this claim, to no avail. Golubić did join Young Bosnia (Serbo-Croatian: Mlada Bosna), a multi-ethnic youth organization agitating for the separation of Bosnia and Herzegovina from Austria-Hungary. The organization's membership was around 70 percent Serb, 20 percent Bosnian Muslim and 10 percent Croat. Following the outbreak of the Balkan Wars in October 1912, Golubić joined the volunteer Chetnik detachment of Major Vojislav Tankosić and served in Macedonia as a member of an "armed propaganda" unit. As part of their training, Tankosić ordered that Golubić and the other volunteers jump into the Sava from a railway bridge, "just to see whether you are going to fulfill all my orders."

Once the Balkan Wars had ended in August 1913, Golubić left Serbia and moved to Toulouse to continue his studies. On 14 January 1914, he met with Young Bosnia members Vladimir Gaćinović and Muhamed Mehmedbašić to plan the assassination of the Austro-Hungarian Governor of Bosnia and Herzegovina, Oskar Potiorek, but the plot failed to materialize. Following the assassination of Archduke Franz Ferdinand on 28 June 1914 by the Young Bosnia member Gavrilo Princip, Golubić returned to Serbia, where he again joined the ranks of Tankosić's Chetniks and fought in the Battle of the Drina (7–24 September 1914) and the Battle of Kolubara (November–December 1914). Shortly thereafter, he was reassigned to the Bosnian Battalion of the Užice Army, which was under the command of General Ilija Gojković and whose chief of staff was Colonel Dragutin Dimitrijević, the head of Serbian military intelligence and leader of the Black Hand secret society. Golubić arrived with a letter of recommendation signed by the academic Jevto Dedijer. In 1915, Golubić was dispatched by Dimitrijević to the Russian Empire on a mission to recruit volunteers to join the Royal Serbian Army. He returned to Serbia in September 1915, shortly before Austria-Hungary, Germany and Bulgaria's combined invasion of the country, which forced its military and thousands of civilians to undertake a perilous retreat across Albania to the Greek island of Corfu.

Following the retreat, Golubić approached Dimitrijević with the idea of illegally entering Germany via Switzerland and assassinating Kaiser Wilhelm II. Dimitrijević apparently approved of the plan. Golubić subsequently traveled to France, where he was arrested in Paris and imprisoned in Toulon. In the meantime, Dimitrijević was arrested by the Serbian military police. The arrests effectively put an end to the plot against Wilhelm. Golubić was later deported to Corfu at the request of the Serbian government-in-exile and handed over to the Serbian authorities. He was asked to testify against Dimitrijević, who stood accused of plotting against Crown Prince Alexander I. Despite undergoing torture at the hands of the Serbian military police, Golubić refused to speak. Dimitrijević was executed following the Salonika trial in June 1917. Golubić was released and left Corfu, relocating to France via Italy, and settling there for the remainder of the war.

=== Interwar period ===
In 1919, Golubić returned to Serbia, which had in the meantime united with the other South Slavic lands in the western Balkans to form the Kingdom of Serbs, Croats and Slovenes, Golubić was immediately arrested and imprisoned inside the Rakovica Monastery. Shortly thereafter, he was exiled to Stolac and placed under constant police surveillance. After being accused of making death threats against Alexander, Golubić left the country in late 1920 and settled in Vienna. He subsequently survived an assassination attempt, and after the Austrian authorities revoked his temporary residence visa, was forced to move to Prague. The following year, he returned to Austria illegally and once again settled in Vienna. Shortly upon his return, he joined the Communist Party of Yugoslavia (Serbo-Croatian: Komunistička partija Jugoslavije; KPJ). Between 1923 and 1927, he wrote for the Vienna-based publication La Fédération balkanique under the pseudonym Nikola Nenadović. The publication was directly subordinated to Soviet intelligence. During this time, he collaborated with the high-ranking Soviet agents Labud Kusovac and Pavle Bastajić. In one of his articles for La Fédération balkanique, Golubić claimed that Dimitrijević had organized and financed the assassination of Archduke Franz Ferdinand with the knowledge of the senior Russian diplomat Nicholas Hartwig, the Russian military attaché Viktor Alekseevich Artamonov, Serbian Prime Minister Nikola Pašić, and crown prince Alexander. Describing the claims as unsubstantiated, Dedijer concludes that Golubić made these allegations "in a spirit of revenge" against Alexander, who had forced him into exile.

In 1927, Golubić moved to Moscow, where he began working for the Joint State Political Directorate (OGPU), which was later renamed the People's Commissariat for Internal Affairs (NKVD). Alongside fellow Yugoslavs such as Vlajko Begović and Mirko Marković, Golubić played a key role in the Soviet Union's covert efforts to further the cause of the "world revolution". In this capacity, he took part in countless assassinations of the Soviet Union's political opponents and adversaries abroad. His assignments took him to France, Spain, China, Japan, and North America. Golubić eventually attained the rank of colonel. The covert nature of Golubić's activities led to him having an almost legendary reputation among the interwar Yugoslav communists. His exploits became the subject of numerous tales and yarns, the authenticity of which is difficult if not impossible to ascertain. Golubić was one of the few Yugoslavs living in the Soviet Union who survived the Great Purge. Of the approximately 900 Yugoslav communists living in the country in 1936–1937, at least 800 were arrested, and only forty of these survived the Gulag.

=== World War II and death ===
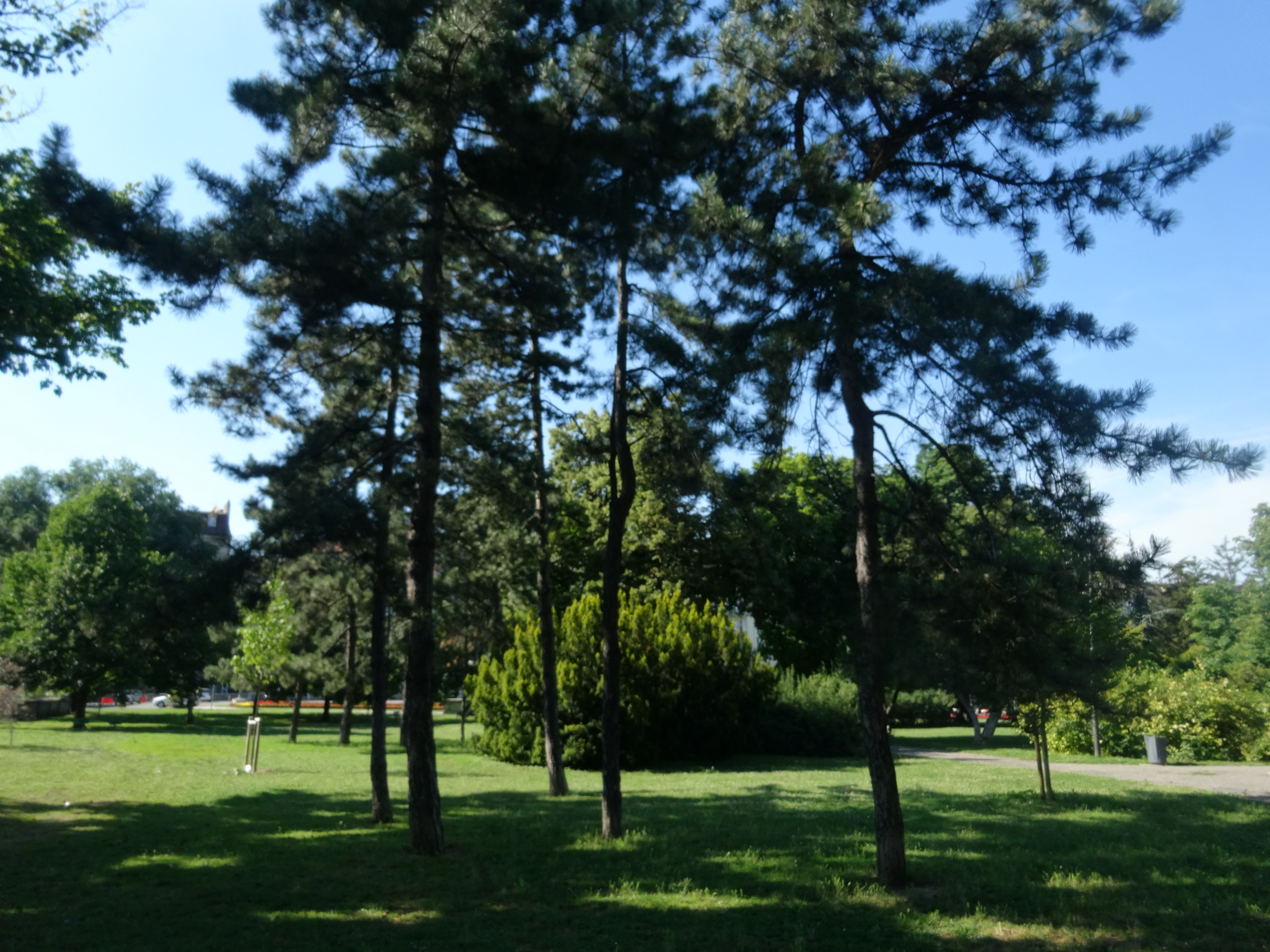
Golubić was shot in modern-day Pioneers Park

During the interwar period, Golubić's nephew Meho had been an active communist agitator within Yugoslavia. In 1940, the senior Golubić entered Yugoslavia illegally. He thus became one of the Soviets' principal agents in the country. Golubić subsequently made contact with Dragiša Vasić and Mladen Žujović, who along with Stevan Moljević, would go on to become the chief advisers of Draža Mihailović, the leader of the wartime Yugoslav Army in the Fatherland. Golubić's time in Yugoslavia was marked by frequent clashes with the KPJ. According to the senior Yugoslav communist Milovan Djilas, Golubić was hostile to the KPJ's Central Committee, claiming that it was "composed of Trotskyites". Djilas, together with Aleksandar Ranković, another senior KPJ member, suspected Golubić himself of being a Trotskyite and feared that he was spreading misinformation regarding the Central Committee's activities to Moscow. According to Djilas, he and Ranković were prepared to assassinate Golubić, but were told to desist by Josip Broz Tito, the General Secretary of the Central Committee, who identified Golubić as an agent on "special assignment" and ordered that he be left alone.

On 5 June 1941, an explosion tore through a German ammunition dump in Smederevo, killing hundreds of residents and leaving much of the town in ruins. It has been speculated that the blast may have been triggered by communist saboteurs headed by Golubić. However, academic historiography dismisses these claims. Two days later, Golubić was arrested at the home of the lawyer Tihomir Višnjević in a joint action carried out by the Sicherheitsdienst (SD) and the Sicherheitspolizei (SiPo). Golubić had been using the pseudonym Luka Samardžić. He was subsequently placed in the custody of the Gestapo, who tortured him. According to the war correspondent Sima Simić, who was detained alongside Golubić, the latter was so severely beaten that his face had turned blue and his urine was filled with blood. Golubić adamantly refused to disclose any information to the Gestapo. In July, after several weeks of torture, Golubić was taken to the Royal Garden in downtown Belgrade (modern-day Pioneers Park) and shot. He was survived by his mother, who died in 1953, aged 103.

== Legacy ==
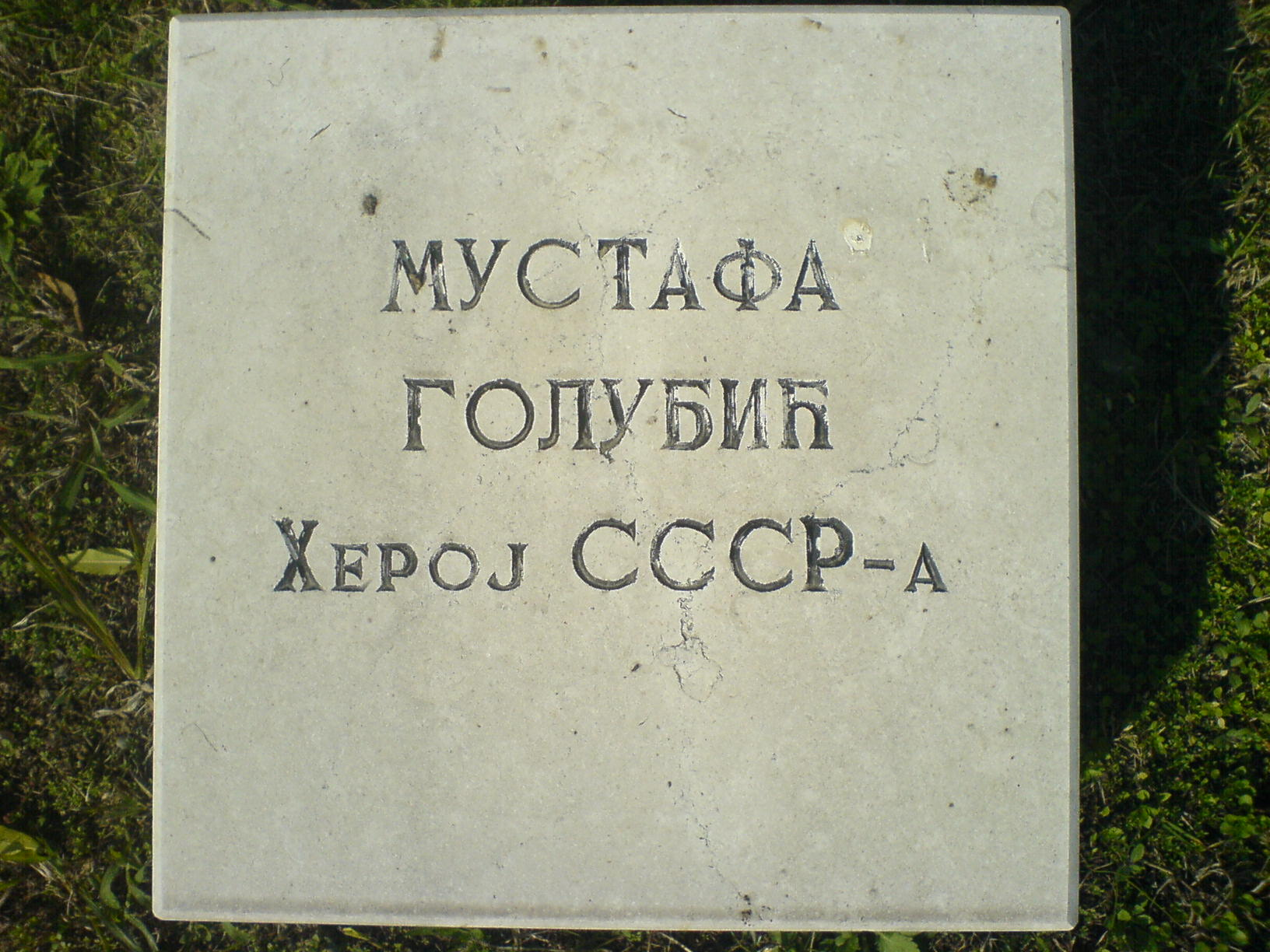
Commemorative plaque in Belgrade's New Cemetery

Following Golubić's death, the Yugoslav Partisans named a company in his honour; it was composed primarily of Bosnian Muslim fighters. After the war, a Sarajevo street was named after him.

In the mid-1980s, the Bosnian playwright Sead Trhulj wrote a stage play about Golubić's life. During the Bosnian War, the Sarajevo street that had been named after Golubić was renamed by the local authorities on account of Golubić's political affiliations, which were perceived as pro-Serb.

Golubić is portrayed by the actor Goran Bogdan in the television series Senke nad Balkanom (Shadows Over the Balkans).

== See also ==
- Duško Popov, Serbian double agent
