= Bogdan Žerajić =

Bosnian attempted assassin

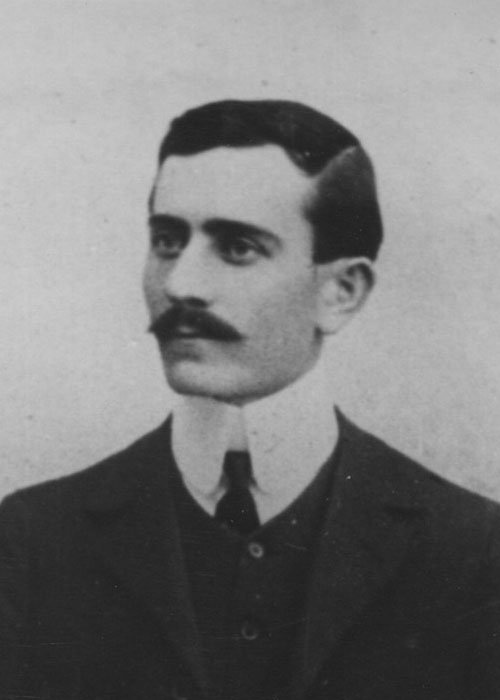
- Born: 1 February 1886; Miljevac, Nevesinje, Bosnia and Herzegovina, Austria-Hungary
- Died: 15 June 1910 (aged 24); Sarajevo, Bosnia and Herzegovina, Austria-Hungary
- Resting place: Vidovdan Heroes Chapel, Sarajevo
- Occupation: Student
- Known for: Being a source of inspiration to Gavrilo Princip

Bogdan Žerajić (Serbian Cyrillic: Богдан Жерајић; 1 February 1886 – 15 June 1910) was a Herzegovinian Serb student of the Faculty of Law at the University of Zagreb.

In 1910, he attempted to assassinate General Marijan Varešanin, the governor of Bosnia and Herzegovina, on the opening day of the Austro-Hungarian Parliament of Bosnia and Herzegovina since he believed it to be illegal and illegitimate. His attempt was his own initiative as an act of personal revolt against Austro-Hungarian annexation of Bosnia and Herzegovina.

Žerajić was the first in Bosnia and Herzegovina to pursue tyrannicide as a method of political struggle. His act had great impact on the youth of Bosnia and Herzegovina, but the official press in Sarajevo and Belgrade generally referred to it as an act of a disturbed lunatic, which was also generally the view of the older generation of Sarajevo Serbs.

== Secret societies and tyrannicide ==
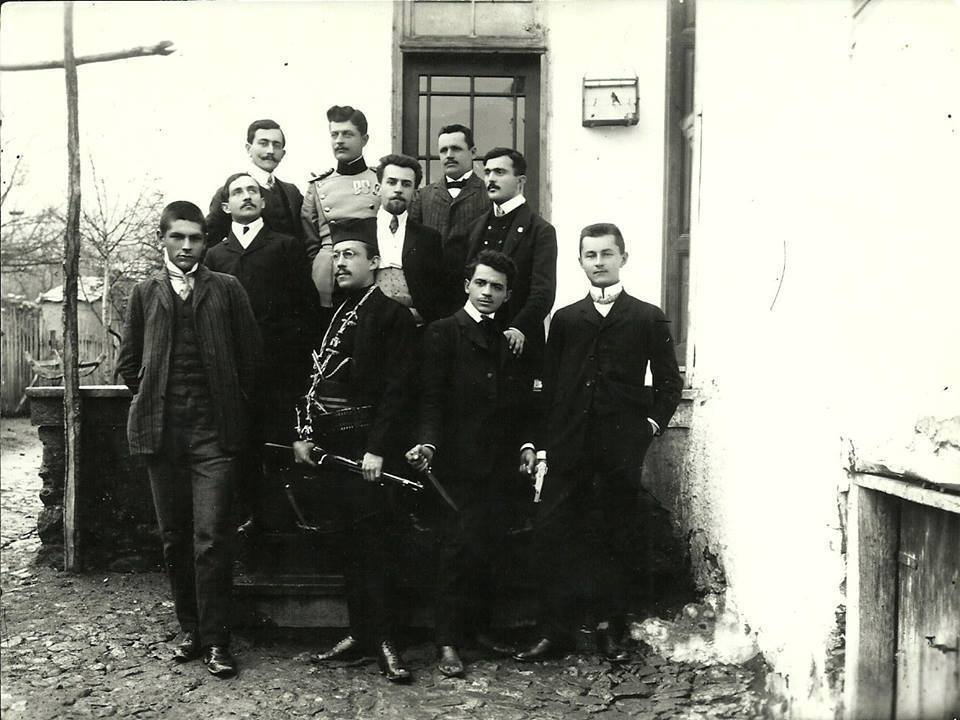
Chetnik training in Vranje, 1900s.

Žerajić and Špiro Soldo were leaders of the secret society "Freedom" (Serbian: Слобода) established in 1905/1906. Žerajić's friendship with Vladimir Gaćinović and his attempted assassination of Varešanin also inspired the members of the revolutionary movement Young Bosnia, including Gavrilo Princip. Gaćinović was the real ideologue of the revolutionary movement Young Bosnia and advocated tyrannicide as a method of political struggle. Some authors, including Vladimir Dedijer, emphasise that the basis for this method of political struggle is the cult of "Kosovo tyrannicide".

Žerajić was first to apply that method in the practice. When Franz Joseph I of Austria visited Bosnia and Herzegovina on 3 June 1910, Žerajić had the intention to attempt his assassination during his visit to Mostar but changed his mind for an unknown reason.

== Attempted assassination of Varešanin ==
Žerajić decided to assassinate General Marijan Varešanin, the governor of Bosnia and Herzegovina, after an article written by Risto Radulović, who argued against dispiritedness in the public life of Bosnia and Herzegovina. In his article, Radulović explained that he did not see glorious moments of the nation or a single tragedy, which he believed to be was necessary to temper the struggle. When Žerajić read those words he yelled, "There will be a tragedy!"

On 15 June 1910, Žerajić attempted to assassinate Varešanin on the day of opening of the Austro-Hungarian Diet of Bosnia because he believed it was illegal and illegitimate. He shot at Varešanin five times and missed. With his last, sixth, bullet Žerajić killed himself. Before he died, he said that he expected Serbdom to avenge his death. His action brought Young Bosnia to the public attention.

== Aftermath ==
Žerajić's assassination attempt had a significant influence on youth in Bosnia and Herzegovina. New revolutionary circles were established in Sarajevo, Mostar, Tuzla and Banja Luka.

An evening before the assassination of Archduke Franz Ferdinand, Gavrilo Princip, Čabrinović and Ilić visited the grave of Žerajić for the last time. Žerajić's proclamation "He who wants to live, let him die. He who wants to die, let him live", was quoted by Gavrilo Princip in one of the songs he wrote (Serbian: Ал право је рекао пре Жерајић, соко сиви: Ко хоће да живи, нек мре, Ко хоће да мре, нек живи).

The official press in Bosnia and Herzegovina and most of the newspapers from Serbia described Žerajićs attempt as the action of a mentally ill person. The older generation of Serbs in Sarajevo had a similar position.

== See also ==
- Gavrilo Princip
- Vladimir Gaćinović
- Jovan Skerlić
- Nadežda Petrović

== General sources ==
- Ćorović, Vladimir; Ljubinković, Nenad; Arsić, Irena (1997). Istorija srpskog naroda. Glas srpski. ISBN 9788671191012.
