= Berta Bergman =

Yugoslav physician

- Bergman as head of the children's polyclinic in Mostar
- Born: Berta Jozefa Bergmann; 10 May 1894; Sarajevo, Condominium of Bosnia and Herzegovina, Austria-Hungary
- Died: 15 January 1945 (aged 51); Jasenovac concentration camp, Independent State of Croatia
- Cause of death: Murdered in the Holocaust
- Education: University of Vienna
- Occupation: Medical physician
- Years active: 1918–1945

Berta Jozefa Bergman (née Bergmann; 10 May 1894–15 January 1945) was a Bosnian Jewish physician and partisan. She is also well known for being the first woman to finish high school in Bosnia.

== Early life ==
Berta Bergman was born 10 May 1894 in Sarajevo, Austria-Hungary (modern day Bosnia and Herzegovina) to a family of German-speaking Ashkenazi Jews from Vienna. The eldest of four daughters, her parents Jozef and Ernestina had moved to Sarajevo during the Austro-Hungarian occupation of Bosnia, as Jozef worked as a railway engineer for the Imperial Royal Austrian State of Railways. Despite the family having a strong financial income, Bergman's mother vowed to secure a higher education for her daughters.

Berta and her older sister Marija made headlines when they became the first female pupils at Mostar Gymnasium in 1905. In February 1912, the Croatian newspaper Narodna obrana published a report saying that Berta was the first woman in Bosnia and Herzegovina to graduate from school. She went on to study medicine at the University of Vienna, graduating in 1918. All her younger sisters would also receive university degrees; her sister Marija became the first Bosnian woman to be awarded a doctorate.

== Career ==
Bergman's career as a pediatrician took her across the newly established Kingdom of Yugoslavia, including Banja Luka and Mostar. After quitting her position in Banja Luka, Bergman was awarded money for her hard work and self-sacrifices. She then worked in Mostar where she became head of a successful children's polyclinic.

== Invasion and death ==
After the invasion of Yugoslavia by Nazi Germany in April 1941 and the establishment of the Independent State of Croatia, a fascist puppet state, on the territory which included Bosnia and Herzegovina, Bergman lost her job. Her sister Marija and her family were deported to the Rab concentration camp, while the 49-year-old doctor Bergman joined the Partisan guerrilla resistance movement. She provided the partisans with medical care, supplies and first aid lessons. She was imprisoned twice; the capture on 15 January 1945 led to her deportation to Jasenovac concentration camp, where she was killed by the Ustaše.
