= Eric Gutkind =

German Jewish philosopher (1877–1965)

- Born: February 9, 1877; Berlin, German Empire
- Died: August 26, 1965 (aged 88); New York City, U.S.
- Education: University of Berlin
- Occupation: philosopher

Eric Gutkind (also Erich; 9 February 1877 – 26 August 1965) was a German Jewish philosopher.

== Life ==
His parents were Hermann Gutkind and Elise Weinberg (1852–1942).

Eric Gutkind was born in Berlin and educated at the Humanistic Gymnasium and the University of Berlin. He studied anthropology with J. J. Bachofen, and also worked in philosophy, mathematics, the sciences and the history of art. Starting with a vision of history having something in common with ancient Gnosticism, he became increasingly interested in Jewish philosophy and formulated his ideas in terms of concepts drawn from the Kabbala.

Eric Gutkind belonged to a pacificist-mystical circle of European intellectuals which at different points included Walter Benjamin, Martin Buber, L. E. J. Brouwer, Henri Borel, Frederik van Eeden, Wassily Kandinsky, Franz Oppenheimer, Walther Rathenau, Romain Rolland, Upton Sinclair and Rabindranath Tagore.

In 1910, he published the book "Siderische Geburt: Seraphische Wanderung vom Tode der Welt zur Taufe der Tat" (Sideric birth: seraphic peregrination from the death of the world to the baptism of action) under the pseudonym Volker. This book served as a focal point for the pacifist-mystical circle and later became the philosophical manifesto for the New Europe Groups organized in London in the 1920s by the Yugoslavian teacher Dimitrije Mitrinović, which attracted such men as Sir Patrick Geddes, Sir Frederick Soddy and John Cowper Powys. Dimitrije Mitrinović and Gutkind published a number of articles in the literary magazine The New Age.

His second book, The Absolute Collective, published in London in 1937, was hailed by Henry Miller as "true in the highest sense, entirely on the side of life."

When Gutkind came to the United States in 1933 and began teaching at the New School and the College of the City of New York, Eric Gutkind already had an influential following. His third book, Choose Life: The Biblical Call To Revolt, published in the United States in 1952, was a reinterpretation of traditional Judaism which drew to his lectures many students dissatisfied with both liberalism and orthodoxy and looking for something more concrete and dynamic than both. Gutkind sent a copy of this book to Albert Einstein, who responded in a letter dated Princeton, 3 January 1954. (Note: Einstein's letter was sold at auction in 2008 for $404,000; in 2012 it was reported to have been sold to an unknown buyer via eBay for $3,000,100; However, in 2018 Christie's reported that it had not been sold then and auctioned it from the same 2008 buyer for almost $2.9 million.) In the letter, Einstein wrote Gutkind:

The word God is for me nothing but the expression and product of human weaknesses, the Bible a collection of venerable but still rather primitive legends. No interpretation, no matter how subtle, can (for me) change anything about this. [...] For me the Jewish religion like all other religions is an incarnation of the most childish superstition. [...] I cannot see anything 'chosen' about them [the Jewish people].

Gutkind died in Chautauqua, New York, on August 26, 1965.

== Works ==
- Siderische Geburt: Seraphische Wanderung vom Tode der Welt zur Taufe der Tat; 1910, 1914; large selections from that book, previously circulated in English only in manuscript, are published for the first time in The Body of God)
- The Absolute Collective: A Philosophical Attempt to overcome our Broken State; Translated from the original German by Marjorie Gabain, London 1937
- Choose Life: The Biblical Call to Revolt; 1952; Reprint: Nabu Press 2011, ISBN 978-1175245113 (online on archive.org)
- posthumous: The Body of God. First Steps Toward an Anti-Theology. The Collected Papers of Eric Gutkind, ed. by Lucie B. Gutkind/ Henry LeRoy Finch, New York 1969

== Secondary Literature ==
- H. C. Rutherford: Erich Gutkind as Prophet of the New Age, New Atlantis Foundation 1975, ISBN 978-0900991172 (English-German; PDF; 719 kB)
