= Miško Jovanović =

Narodna Odbrana agent involved in the assassination of Archduke Franz Ferdinand of Austria

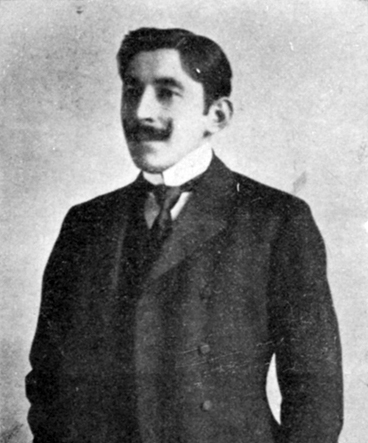
- Miško Jovanović, c. 1910
- Born: 15 June 1878; Tuzla, Bosnia and Herzegovina, Austria-Hungary
- Died: 3 February 1915 (aged 36); Sarajevo, Bosnia and Herzegovina, Austria-Hungary
- Cause of death: Execution by hanging
- Resting place: Vidovdan Heroes Chapel, Sarajevo

Mihajlo "Miško" Jovanović (Serbian Cyrillic: Михајло Мишко Јовановић; 15 June 1878 – 3 February 1915) was a Bosnian Serb who was involved in the assassination of Archduke Franz Ferdinand of Austria.

He was a Narodna Odbrana agent who aided the assassins of Young Bosnia. On 3 February 1915, he was executed by hanging, along with Danilo Ilić and Veljko Čubrilović.

== Literature ==
- Blakley, Patrick R. F. (2009). "Narodna Odbrana (The Black Hand): Terrorist Faction that Divided the World" (PDF). Oswego Historical Review. 2: 13–34.
- Owings, W. A. Dolph. (1984). The Sarajevo Trial. Chapel Hill, NC: Documentary Publications. ISBN 0-89712-122-8.
