= Vidovdan Heroes Chapel =

Serbian Orthodox chapel and mausoleum

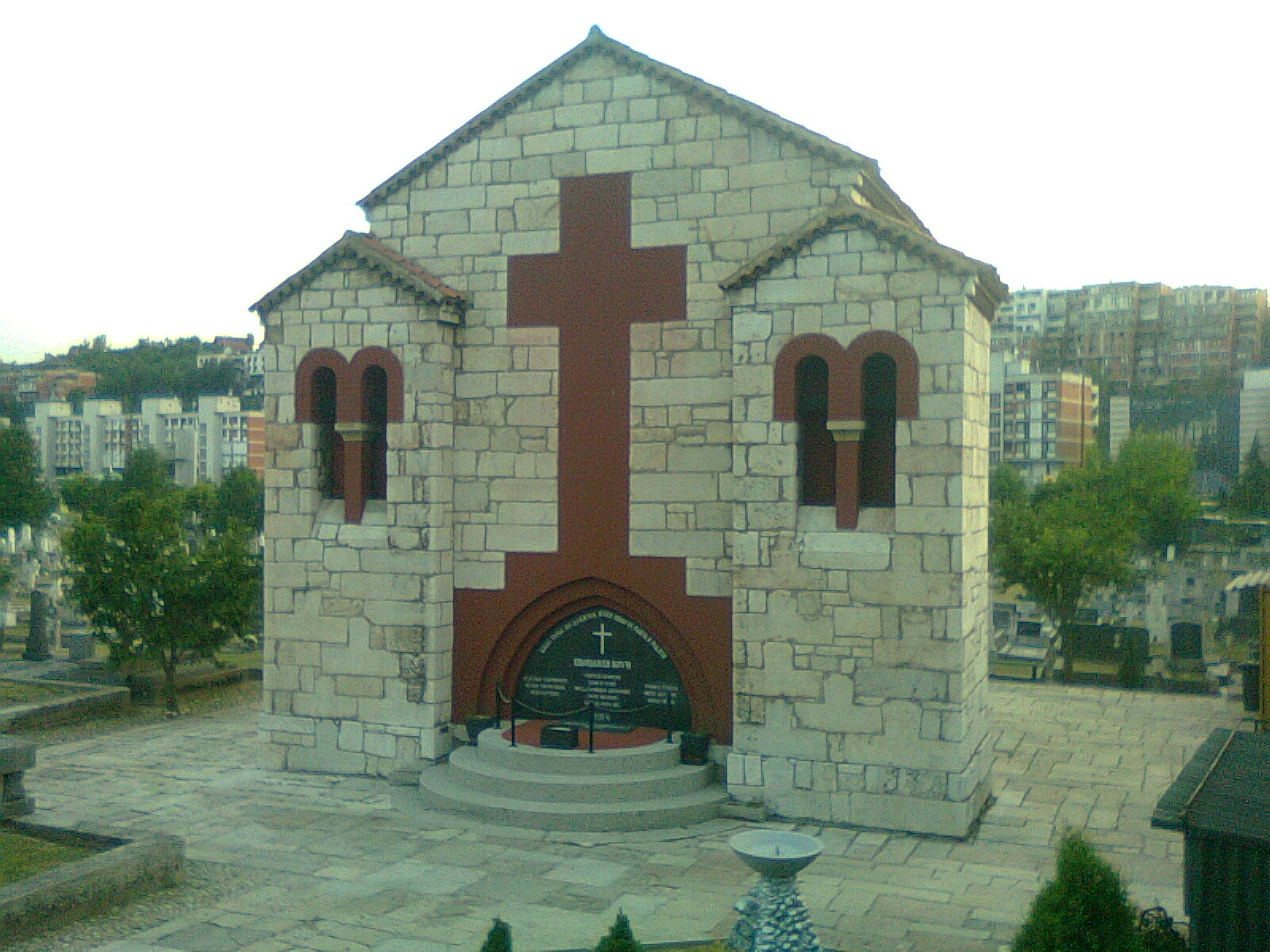
- Vidovdan Heroes Chapel, pictured in 2012
- Vidovdan Heroes Chapel
- 43°52′0.5″N 18°24′41.3″E
- Location: Sarajevo, Bosnia and Herzegovina
- Denomination: Serbian Orthodox Church

History
- Consecrated: 29 October 1939; 86 years ago

Architecture
- Architect: Aleksandar Deroko
- Style: Serbo-Byzantine Revival

Administration
- Diocese: Metropolitanate of Dabar and Bosnia

The Vidovdan Heroes Chapel Serbian: Капела видовданских хероја, romanized: Kapela vidovdanskih heroja is an Eastern Orthodox chapel and mausoleum located in Sarajevo, Bosnia and Herzegovina, at the Holy Archangels Georgije and Gavrilo Orthodox Cemetery.

The crypt of the chapel contains the bodily remains of Gavrilo Princip and other members of Young Bosnia who took part in the assassination of Archduke Franz Ferdinand on 28 June 1914. The chapel is named after Vidovdan, the day the assassination took place, with the perpetrators of the assassination being referred to as heroes.

== History ==
The remains of those interred in the chapel were initially transferred and buried in a common grave in Sarajevo after World War I on 7 July 1920. On 29 October 1939, after the completion of the Vidovdan Heroes Chapel, the bodies were exhumed and re-interred in the chapel crypt under the front-facing engraved plaque of names which is located under an altar on the other side of it. The only thing that was known in advance was that the remains of Lazar Đukić would not be found as there was no information about where he died or where he was buried. Among the participants in the assassination who lived long after the collapse of Austria-Hungary and the end of World War I who were not buried in the chapel crypt were Muhamed Mehmedbašić, Cvjetko Popović and Vaso Čubrilović.

The remains of Vladimir Gaćinović (the ideological leader of Young Bosnia) were subsequently transferred from Lausanne (where he was poisoned in 1917) to Sarajevo in 1934 and laid in the original common grave. His remains were also buried in the chapel's crypt in 1939. All written traces in the chapel's announcement state that his name would also be engraved on the plaque, but it remains unclear why it wasn't, as his name is not included in the photographs from the chapel's opening.

The chapel was built by the Serbian Orthodox Church Municipality of Sarajevo, headed by Metropolitan Petar of Dabar and Bosnia. The consecration of the chapel was carried out by Metropolitan Petar with the participation of twelve priests, two deacons and the entire Sarajevo Seminary. The chapel was designed by architect Aleksandar Deroko in the Serbo-Byzantine style. The chapel also preserves the memory of the centuries-old Orthodox cemetery that once stood on the site of the current building of the Parliamentary Assembly of Bosnia and Herzegovina and the Greece–Bosnia and Herzegovina Friendship Building. When that building was built, the ancient cemetery was cleared and a special committee examined all the old slabs and tombstones that had been ruined over time. The chapel was built of that old stone, so that the ancient inscriptions, mostly written in Church Slavonic, remained visible on the facades. On the plaque built into the chapel, which bears the inscription Vidovdanski heroji (Vidovdan Heroes) with the names of the interred, there are also the verses of Petar II Petrović-Njegoš which are symbolic of the ideological and libertarian orientation of the entire mythos of the Serbian national being: Blago tome ko dovijek živi, imao se rašta i roditi (Blessed is he who lives forever, having been born for a reason). The endowment founder of the chapel was Steva Prnjatović.

Archimandrite Venijamin Nikolinović (1813–1916) is also buried in the chapel's crypt. Staka Skenderova, Paulina Irby, and Gligorije Jeftanović are also buried in the cemetery near the chapel.

The Serbian Orthodox Church Municipality of Sarajevo managed the cemetery until 2002, when the management was transferred to the Pokop Public Cemetery Company, which was reactivated after a break since 1965. The process of returning the chapel to the ownership of the Serbian Orthodox Church was initiated in 2017 and the Serbian Orthodox Church Municipality of Sarajevo has been the owner of the entire cemetery since.

The chapel was damaged in a vandalism attack in 1996. The renovation work on the chapel (renovation of the roof and staircase) began before the centenary of the Sarajevo assassination in 2014 and was successfully completed in June 2019. In 2019, the renewed chapel was consecrated by Metropolitan Hrizostom of Dabar and Bosnia and dedicated to Saint Cyriacus the Anchorite.

== Burials ==
The twelve people interred in the crypt of the chapel are Gavrilo Princip, Bogdan Žerajić, Vladimir Gaćinović, Nedeljko Čabrinović, Danilo Ilić, Veljko Čubrilović, Neđo Kerović, Mitar Kerović, Mihajlo "Miško" Jovanović, Jakov Milović, Trifko Grabež and Marko Perin.

== See also ==
- Cathedral of the Nativity of the Theotokos
- Church of the Holy Archangels Michael and Gabriel
- Church of the Holy Transfiguration
- Serbs of Sarajevo

== Notes ==
1. Sometimes referred to as the Chapel of Vidovdan Heroes.
2. As there is no archangel close to the name of Georgije, it is assumed that the name was meant to be the Holy Archangels Mihailo and Gavrilo Orthodox Cemetery.
