= Smederevo Fortress explosion =

1941 explosion in Smederevo, Serbia

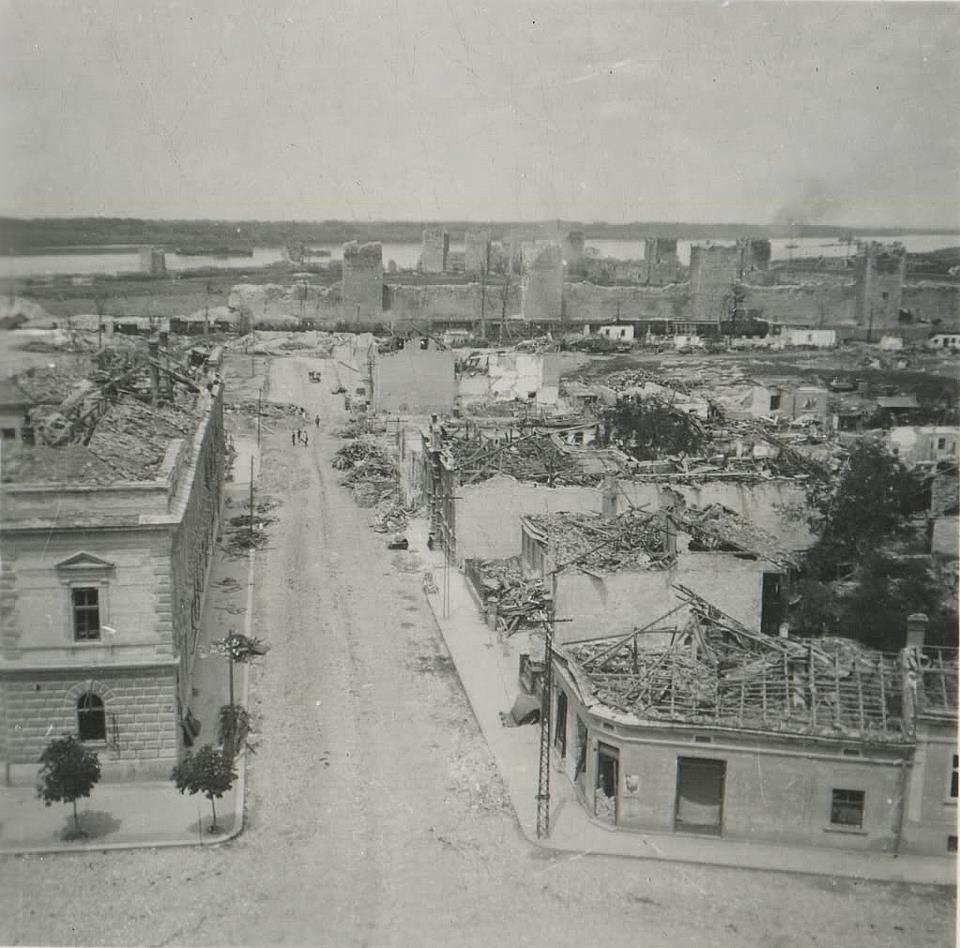
Smederevo after the explosion.

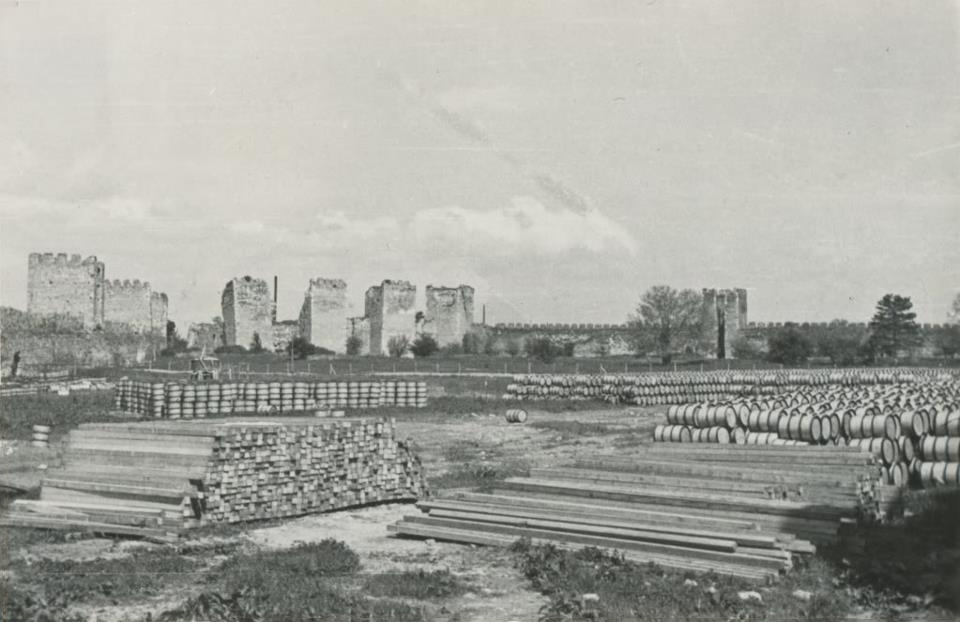
Stockpiled gasoline before the explosion.

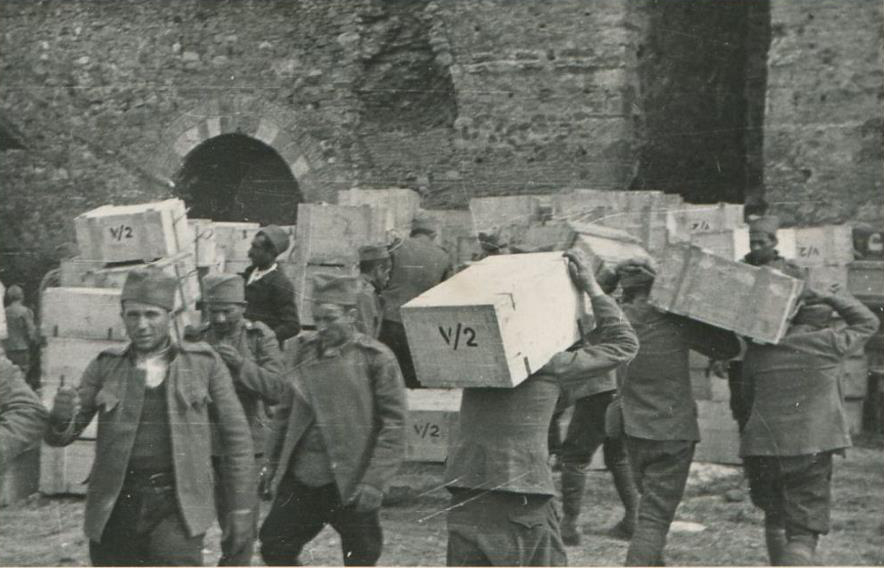
Yugoslav POWs carry ammunition boxes.

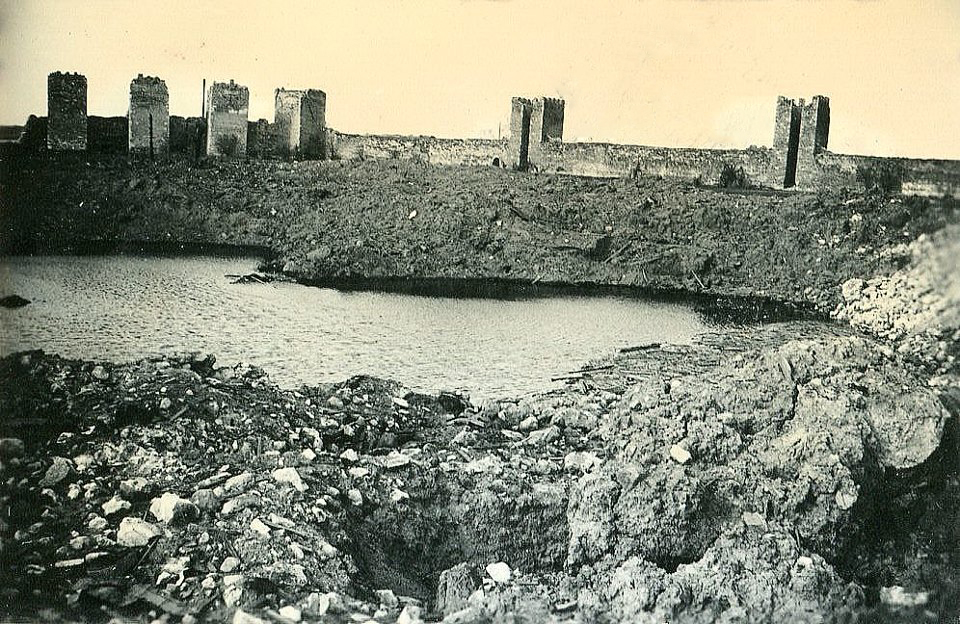
Crater made due to the explosion.

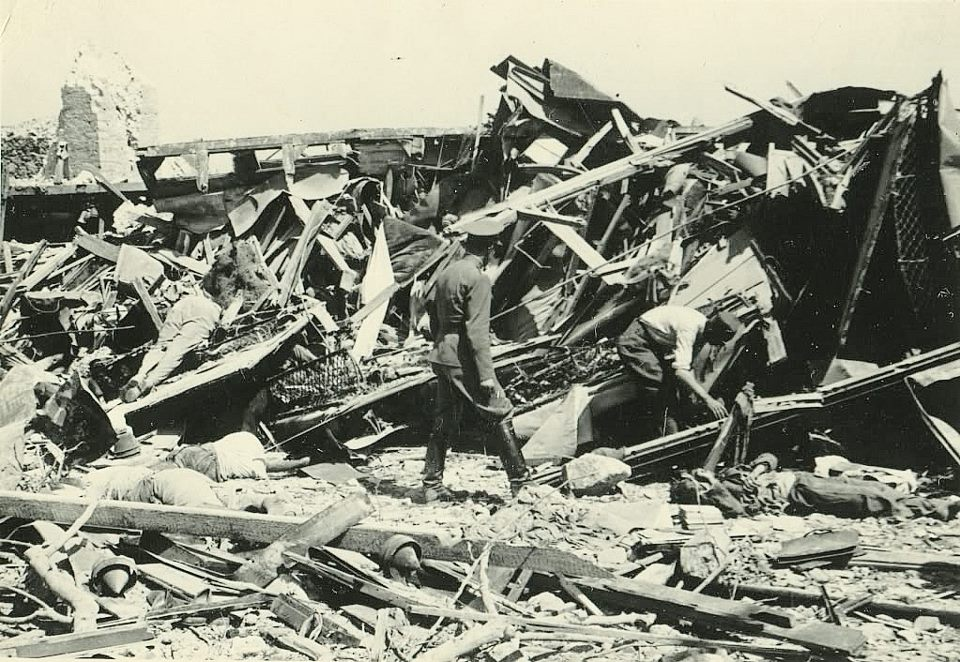
Bodies and derailed train that was crossing by Smederevo Fortress.

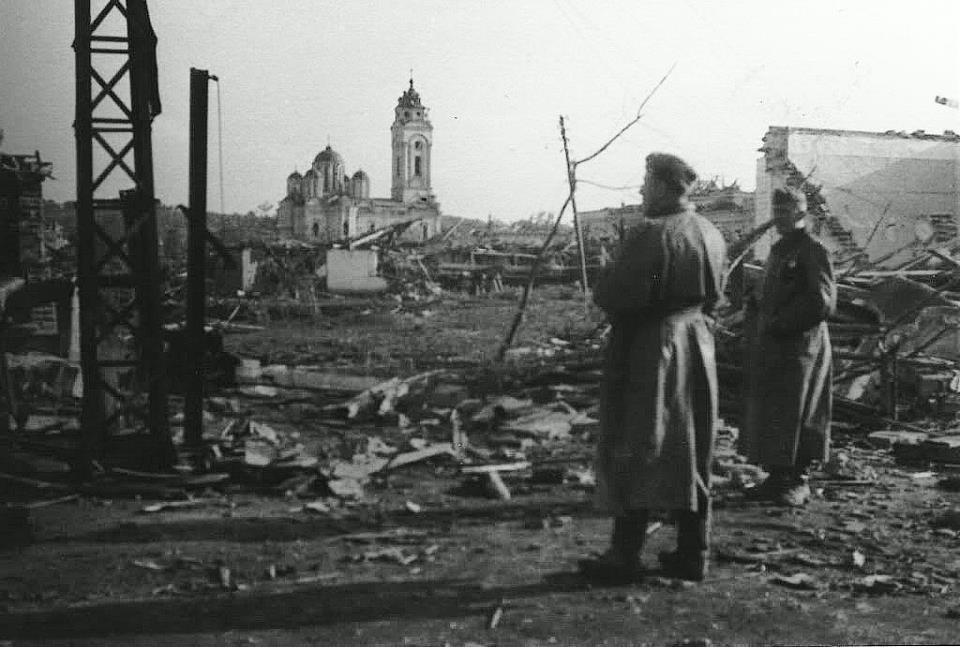
Town center after the explosion

The Smederevo Fortress Explosion was a disaster that occurred in Smederevo, then in the Territory of the Military Commander in Serbia (part of Kingdom of Yugoslavia under German occupation, now in modern Serbia), on the 5th of June 1941. Stockpiled ammunition and gasoline in Smederevo Fortress belonging to the defeated Royal Yugoslav Army exploded for unknown reasons. The number of casualties is also uncertain. Estimates range from several hundred to 2,500 killed.

== Background ==
After the capitulation of Yugoslavia in the April War, the Germans designated Smederevo as a place where captured equipment, weapons, ammunition and gasoline of the former Royal Yugoslav Army would be stored. From there it would be transferred to Germany, which was preparing to attack the USSR. Smederevo was connected by railway and is located on the Danube. The seized material was loaded by RYA prisoners.

== Explosion ==
The day of the explosion was a market day and the inhabitants of the surrounding settlements came to the city to trade. School certificates were also being given to pupils that day. The explosion happened around 2:10 PM, at the time the train for Velika Plana was passing by the fortress which was transporting workers home. According to witness statements, shots were heard first (which could mean that ammunition was set on fire first), followed by a large explosion about two minutes later. The explosion created a crater 50 meters wide and 9 meters deep and destroyed most of Smederevo. Window glass was cracked in settlements around Smederevo, and the tremor was felt in Velika Plana, Bela Crkva, Vršac and Belgrade.

Among the victims were Milan Nedić's son, daughter-in-law and grandson. For the reconstruction of the city, the Commissioner Government appointed Dimitrije Ljotić, a lawyer from Smederevo and the president of Zbor, as the Extraordinary Commissioner for the Reconstruction of Smederevo. He brought 120 young members of his movement to Smederevo and organised a plan for the reconstruction of the city with them.

It has been speculated that the explosion was caused by a discarded cigarette butt from a German soldier, an English plane flying over Smederevo or a local terrorist. Another theory is that Soviet agent Mustafa Golubić, who was arrested two days later in Belgrade, was responsible for it.

In 1973, a monument to the victims of the explosion was erected. The monument was sculpted by Selimir Jovanović, who had survived the explosion.
