= Young Bosnia =

Revolutionary movement during Austro-Hungarian rule in Bosnia and Herzegovina

- Млада Босна; Mlada Bosna
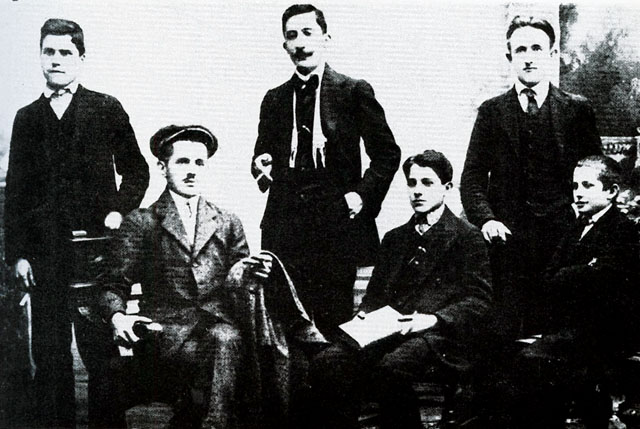
- Some of the members
- Formation: 1904
- Dissolved: After 28 June 1914
- Type: Revolutionary movement
- Key people: Vladimir Gaćinović; Mustafa Golubić; Dimitrije Mitrinović; Gavrilo Princip
- Affiliations: Narodna Odbrana and Black Hand

Young Bosnia (Serbian: Млада Босна, romanized: Mlada Bosna) was a loosely organized revolutionary movement active in the early 20th century, which sought to end the Austro-Hungarian rule in Bosnia and Herzegovina.

Its members, primarily Bosnian Serbs but also Bosnian Muslims and Bosnian Croats, were driven by various ideologies, prominently Yugoslavism, the unification of South Slavic peoples into a single Yugoslav state. The movement drew inspiration from a diverse range of philosophical influences, including German Romanticism, anarchism, and Russian revolutionary socialism.

The most infamous act associated with Young Bosnia was the assassination of Archduke Franz Ferdinand of Austria in Sarajevo on 28 June 1914 by Gavrilo Princip, one of the group's members.

== Background ==
The region of Bosnia and Herzegovina, populated by Serbs, Croats and Muslims, was part of the Ottoman Empire until 1878. After the anti-Ottoman Herzegovina uprising, the region was occupied by Austria-Hungary in 1878. There was a small phase of modernization, however the region remained mostly underdeveloped, highly illiterate and agrarian. The new occupying authorities suppressed political opposition, though underground political opposition existed. In 1882, an uprising broke out against the Austro-Hungarian occupation authorities, but was suppressed by force.

There were a number of youth-oriented organizations before the rise of the movement Young Bosnia, such as United Serb Youth in the 1860s and 1870s. Defining membership and the vague idea of "youth" (omladina) was debated at length among South Slavic intellectuals. One major obstacle to defining and organizing the youth in Bosnia and Herzegovina was the educational system, which underwent major changes in the Habsburg period. By 1900, a small but growing number of young men from Bosnia were studying in Prague, Zagreb, Vienna, Graz, Istanbul, and Belgrade. This put them in touch with Serbian and Croatian nationalist circles. The rise to power of the popular Karađorđević dynasty in Serbia in the 1900s after the May Overthrow of the Obrenović dynasty by the Royal Serbian Army in 1903, stimulated support by both Serbs and South Slavs for their unification into a state led by Serbia.

== Formation, membership and ideology ==
No unified organization was named Young Bosnia, while contemporaries rarely used the term. It had no statute and a hierarchy. Young Bosnia had a decentralized structure consisting of small circles, connected only by designated intermediaries. The participants of Bosnian student movements did not have a common ideology, unified view of strategy or tactics, and were not part of a unified organization. Per writer Veselin Masleša:

[There is a] shortage of sources about Young Bosnia itself. Memoirs are weak, incomplete, and unreliable. All the participants of that movement who have written about it have fallen into one basic error: They have devoted more attention to their views at the time they were writing than to the movement itself.

Young Bosnia was a revolutionary movement active in Bosnia and Herzegovina before World War I. Young Bosnia has been also defined as "loosely connected secret student organisations based in Bosnia and Herzegovina" and "aggregation of groups and cells of revolutionary youth". Austro-Hungarian authorities referred to Young Bosnians as Jugoslawen (Yugoslavs).

Young Bosnia started operating in 1904. On 6 October 1908, the region was annexed by the Austro-Hungarian authorities. The Austro-Hungarian annexation of Bosnia ignited the Bosnian Crisis in European politics and unrest in the province. The establishment of the Diet of Bosnia happened only in February 1910, and the 1910 Bosnian parliamentary election in May the same year. In 1909, the Young Bosnia was a loose circle of mainly Bosnian Serb students whose interest in revolutionary and romantic Yugoslavism was prompted by the annexation. Vladimir Gaćinović was the main ideologist of Young Bosnia and of tyrannicide as its method of political struggle. Petar Kočić led the most ardent anti-Austrian Serb nationalists and had ties to Young Bosnia. Per political scientist Radoslav Gaćinović, the term "Young Bosnia" was first used by Petar Kočić in the journal "Homeland" (Serbo-Croatian: Отаџбина, Otadžbina) in 1907. Allegedly, this was a mistake in the year of publication. In June 1910, Bogdan Žerajić killed himself after failing to assassinate General Marijan Varešanin, the Austro-Hungarian governor of Bosnia and Herzegovina. In 1911, Gaćinović published an article titled "Young Bosnia" in Almanac (Serbo-Croatian: Алманах, Almanah) published by Prosvjeta. In the same year, he became a member of Black Hand and Narodna Odbrana (National Defense). Support for revolutionary Yugoslavism in Bosnia grew with the rise of the Serb-Croat Progressive Organization in 1911 which drew in support for the cause from Serbs as well as Croats and some Bosnian Muslims. The organization was a youth society led by Ivo Andrić that promoted unity and friendship between Serb and Croat youth and opposed the Austro-Hungarian occupation, but was decried by nationalists and harassed by the government.

The members were predominantly students, primarily Bosnian Serbs but also Bosnian Muslims and Bosnian Croats. Its members were also young peasants. Višnja Mosić used the cover of shepherding to transmit messages for Young Bosnia.

There were two main ideologies promoted amongst Young Bosnian members, Yugoslavism and Pan-Serbism. Historians have debated whether Young Bosnia was Serb nationalist or pan-Yugoslav. Gaćinović did not favor Yugoslavism and he perceived it as "mixing the Croatian water with Serbian wine". His program articles mostly contained only the Serbian national idea. Unlike Gaćinović, a leading ideologist of the movement and Bosnian Serb Dimitrije Mitrinović advocated for Yugoslavism. Per historian Ivo Banac: "His utopian vision of Great Yugoslavia was a powerful indication of how the idea of Yugoslavism could be grafted unto Serbian expansionism." The goal of Young Bosnia was to promote the Yugoslav national idea among the locals, wanting to include all South Slavs into a Yugoslav federation. Young Bosnia was inspired by a variety of ideas, movements, theorists, and events; such as German romanticism, Italian national movement, Serbian nationalism, anarchism, Russian revolutionary socialism, and anti-imperialism. Young Bosnians read works by Nikolay Chernyshevsky, Mikhail Bakunin, Alexander Herzen, Fyodor Dostoevsky, and Maxim Gorky. They were also inspired by the works of Friedrich Nietzsche, Henrik Ibsen, Oscar Wilde, and Walt Whitman. The Young Bosnians romanticized South Slavic history, especially the Battle of Kosovo. The Young Bosnians used the Kosovo Myth to validate their self-sacrifice. They honored Bogdan Žerajić's attempted assassination. Young Bosnians believed that revolution was the only way to gain the liberation of Bosnia and Herzegovina from Austria-Hungary. They constructed their program on the theory of national sovereignty, believing that sovereignty comes from the people and that a government is illegitimate if the sovereignty is not from the people. Per Radoslav Gaćinović, the motto of the movement was: We want to either die in life or live in death.

While Young Bosnia and the Black Hand struggled for national liberation, the two were different as Young Bosnia wanted to establish a South Slavic state, while its members were atheistic and young people with republican views. The latter wanted to create a pan-Serbian or Serb-dominated Yugoslav state, and supported authoritarian, militaristic, and clerical worldviews. The extent and significance of the influence from neighboring Kingdom of Serbia has been debated by historians, and it seems that the interactions between Young Bosnia and Black Hand agents (disguised as Narodna Odbrana representatives) were largely initiated by the former, rather than the latter. American historian Wayne S. Vucinich credited Young Bosnians with converting Black Hand members from Greater Serbia to Yugoslavism. Young Bosnian activities were supported by the pan-Serbian secret society Narodna Odbrana.

== Assassination of Archduke Franz Ferdinand of Austria ==
Archduke Franz Ferdinand was assassinated in Sarajevo on 28 June 1914 by Gavrilo Princip, a member of Young Bosnia. It received assistance from the Black Hand, a secret organization founded by members of the Serbian Army. During a Serbian court-martial in French-occupied Salonika in 1916/1917, Chief of Serbian Military Intelligence Dragutin Dimitrijević, known as "Apis," claimed responsibility for organizing the assassination. Apis used his influence over the Serbian military and the Black Hand to smuggle weapons and assassins into Austrian-occupied Bosnia. Following the trial's conclusion on 26 June 1917, Apis was executed by firing squad. Vladimir Gaćinović condemned the assassination in a letter after the First World War began, presumably to evade responsibility.

During his trial, Princip said:

The political union of the Yugoslavs was always before my eyes, and that was my basic idea... I am a Yugoslav nationalist, aiming for the unification of all Yugoslavs, and I do not care what form of the state, but it must be free from Austria.

— Gavrilo Princip,

People, including members of Young Bosnia, who participated in the assassination were:

- Danilo Ilić (27 July 1890 – 3 February 1915)
- Veljko Čubrilović (1 July 1886 – 3 February 1915)
- Miško Jovanović (15 June 1878 – 3 February 1915)
- Nedeljko Čabrinović (2 February 1895 – 20 January 1916)
- Vladimir Gaćinović (25 May 1890 – 11 August 1917)
- Trifko Grabež (28 June 1895 – February 1916)
- Gavrilo Princip (25 July 1894 – 28 April 1918)
- Muhamed Mehmedbašić (1886 – 29 May 1943)
- Cvjetko Popović (1896 – 9 June 1980)
- Vaso Čubrilović (14 January 1897 – 11 June 1990)

An evening before the assassination of Archduke Franz Ferdinand, Princip, Čabrinović and Ilić had visited the grave of Bogdan Žerajić for the last time. Žerajić's proclamation "He who wants to live, let him die. He who wants to die, let him live", was quoted by Gavrilo Princip in one of the songs he wrote (Serbian: Ал право је рекао пре Жерајић, соко сиви: Ко хоће да живи, нек мре, Ко хоће да мре, нек живи).

== Legacy ==
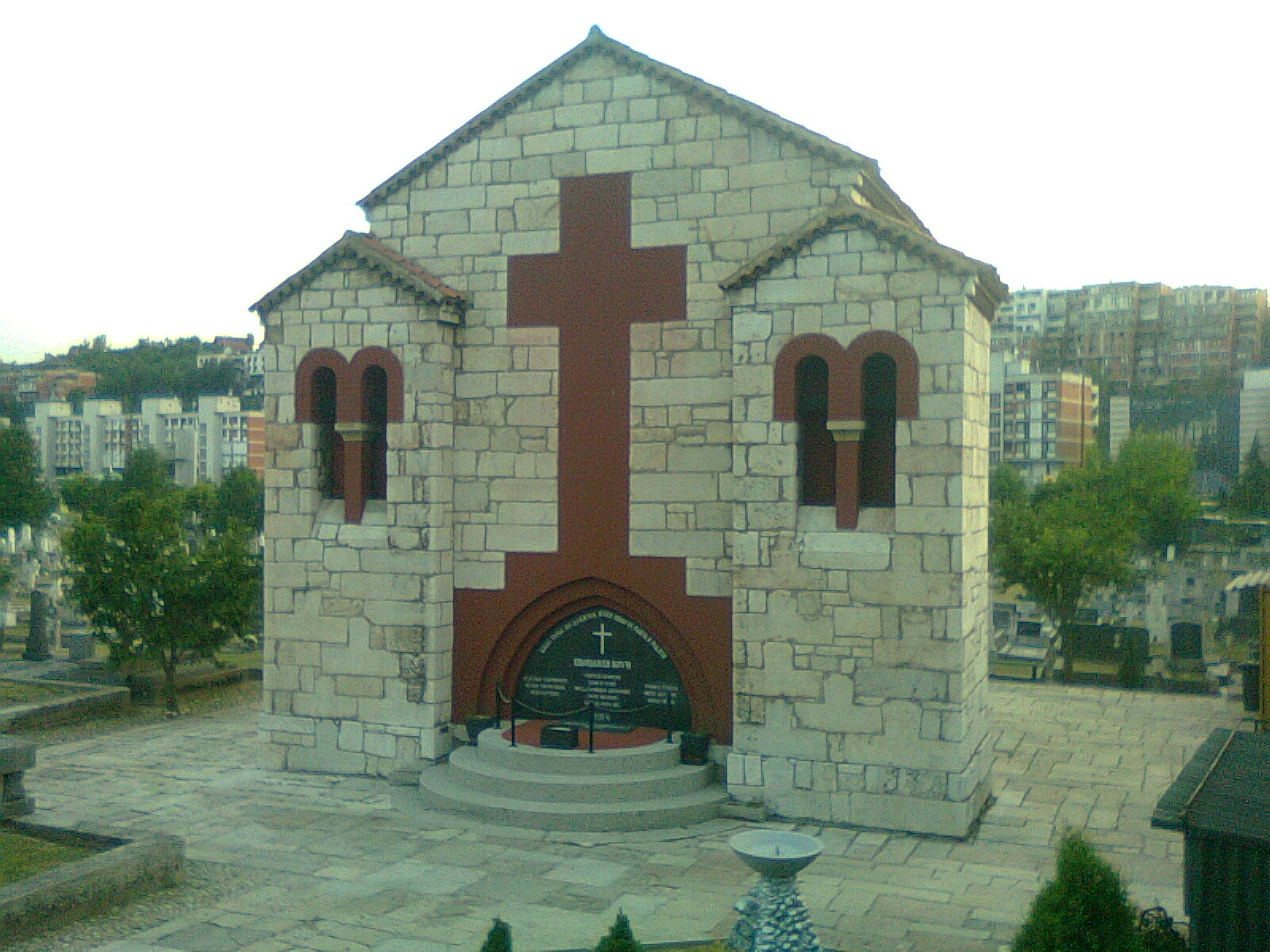
Vidovdan Heroes Chapel in Sarajevo

The first review article about Young Bosnians was published in August 1917 in the fourth issue of Zabavnik by poet and doctoral student of law in Paris, Božidar Purić, titled "Young Bosnia", where he wrote that "they had no doctrine, or established programme or statute. They had them in themselves. They were not created or unified by an à priori idea, but by their lively and atavistic feeling for freedom, for self abnegation and their impulse for greatness." After World War I, Gavrilo Princip's brother established a committee in Hadžići in 1919 to transfer Princip's remains to Bosnia. In the beginning of 1920, a new committee called "The Committee for the transfer of the bones of the Vidovdan heroes" was created in Sarajevo to transfer the remains of the participants of the assassination to Sarajevo. The remains of Princip and his associates were exhumed. In 1920, their remains were buried in Sarajevo. They were regarded as heroes in Czechoslovak media. A former member of the movement, Borivoje Jevtić, defended the act of the participants of the assassination on the cover page of the newspaper Politika on the 15th anniversary of the assassination in 1929. On 29 October 1939, the Vidovdan Heroes Chapel (where the remains of Princip and other Young Bosnian members have been preserved) was consecrated at the Serbian Orthodox cemetery in Sarajevo, Kingdom of Yugoslavia, in the absence of Yugoslav officials, except for a military commander.

Veselin Masleša published Young Bosnia in 1940, and Vladimir Dedijer published Road to Sarajevo in 1966. In his book, Masleša argued that Young Bosnia did not have "enough knowledge," and claimed that its politics "represented nothing more than the most ordinary aggregate of various ideas". He perceived the movement as an "inappropriate expression" of the people in Bosnia and Herzegovina. Dedijer described Young Bosnians in his book as "primitive rebels". Some historians have dismissed the movement as consisting of "frustrated, poor, dreary and maladjusted" adolescents. As Young Bosnian members were interested in literature and poetry, some of them became poets, writers, philosophers, and university professors. On 28 June 1953, the government of Federal People's Republic of Yugoslavia opened the Museum of Young Bosnia and Gavrilo Princip at the site of the assassination. It displayed a red Cyrillic inscription: "From this place on June 28, 1914, Gavrilo Princip's shot gave voice to the national protest against tyranny and our nations' centuries‑long aspiration for freedom." Footprints were also added on the spot from which Princip had fired the shots, which were popular among tourists and locals. During the Bosnian War, the museum was renamed to Museum of Sarajevo 1878–1918 by the Sarajevo Canton Assembly.

== Sources ==
- Banac, Ivo (1988). The National Question in Yugoslavia: Origins, History, Politics. Cornell University Press. ISBN 0-8014-9493-1.
- Dedijer, Vladimir (1966). Sarajevo 1914. Prosveta.
- Dedijer, Vladimir (1966a). The Road to Sarajevo. New York City: Simon & Schuster. OCLC 400010.
- Djokić, Dejan (2003). Yugoslavism: Histories of a Failed Idea, 1918–1992. C. Hurst & Co. Publishers. ISBN 978-1-85065-663-0.
- Halilovic-Pastuovic, M. (2020). Bosnian Post-Refugee Transnationalism: After the Dayton Peace Agreement. Springer International Publishing. ISBN 978-3-030-39564-3.
- Lampe, John R. (2000). Yugoslavia as History: Twice There Was a Country. Cambridge University Press. pp. 90–. ISBN 978-0-521-77401-7.
- Newman, J.P. (2015). Yugoslavia in the Shadow of War: Veterans and the Limits of State Building, 1903–1945. Cambridge University Press. ISBN 978-1-316-38112-0.
- Tomasevich, J. (2002). War and Revolution in Yugoslavia, 1941–1945: Occupation and Collaboration. ACLS Humanities E-Book. Stanford University Press. ISBN 978-0-8047-7924-1.
