= Marija Kon =

Bosnian Germanist and doctor

Marija Kon (née Marie Bergmann; 15 January 1894 – 9 August 1987) was a Bosnian Germanist and the first woman in Bosnia and Herzegovina to be awarded a doctorate.

== Biography ==
Kon was born in Hadžići (near Sarajevo), where her father, Joseph Bergmann, worked as a railway officer. The middle-class Bergmann family, Ashkenazi Jews, moved from Vienna during the Austro-Hungarian rule in Bosnia and Herzegovina. Kon's mother was determined not to allow financial or social issues to limit the opportunities of her four daughters. In order to enable them to attend university, the Bergmanns enrolled their daughters into gymnasium; Marija and her older sister Berta thus became the first female pupils in Mostar's Velika gimnazija in 1905, and seven years later Berta became the first girl in Bosnia and Herzegovina to finish high school. Both sisters went on to study in Vienna, with Kon choosing Slavic and German studies. In 1916 Kon gained a doctorate degree from the University of Vienna and returned to Bosnia and Herzegovina as its first female Doctor of Philosophy.

During the interwar period Kon taught at gymnasiums in Mostar, Cetinje and Sarajevo. She married a civil engineer, Emil Kon, and had two children. With the rise of Nazi Party in Germany in the 1930s, however, antisemitism started gaining foothold in Yugoslavia. Kon had to personally combat proto-Ustaša inclinations of some of her students. The situation rapidly worsened after the invasion of Yugoslavia by Axis powers in April 1941, when Sarajevo and the rest of Bosnia became part of the Independent State of Croatia, a fascist puppet state. Kon lost her job and soon found herself interned with her family in Rab concentration camp. Following the camp's liberation in 1943, she reached Partisan territory in Croatia proper, becoming a gymnasium principal in Glina. Her children became Partisan fighters; her son was killed in action, and her daughter captured and sent to Ravensbrück concentration camp. Kon's sister Berta also actively supported the Partisans until her internment and death in 1945.

Kon and her daughter belonged to a fifth of Sarajevo's Jews who survived the Holocaust. She continued her career in the high schools of Mostar and Sarajevo until 1950, when she was invited to participate in the creation of a German language and literature department at the University of Sarajevo. As university professor she was most involved with early modern and modern German literature until her retirement in 1967. Kon died in Sarajevo in 1987.
