= Dimitrije Mitrinović =

Serbian writer (1887–1953)

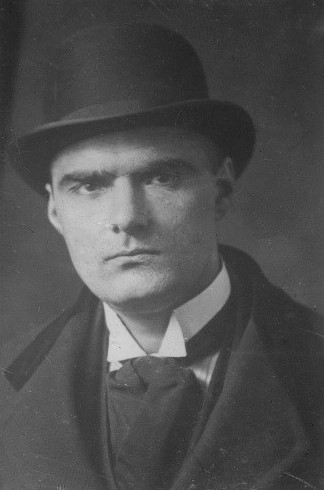
- Mitrinović in 1920
- Born: Dimitrije Mitrinović; 21 October 1887; Donji Poplat, Bosnia and Herzegovina, Austria-Hungary
- Died: 28 August 1953 (aged 65); Richmond, England
- Resting place: Highgate Cemetery
- Other name: Mita Mitrinović

Education
- Education: Mostar Gymnasium
- Alma mater: Ludwig-Maximilians-Universität München

Philosophical work
- Era: 20th-century philosophy
- Region: Yugoslav philosophy Western philosophy
- School: Critical theory
- Main interests: Social theory; Futurology; Pan-Europeanism; Third Way

Dimitrije "Mita" Mitrinović (Serbian Cyrillic: Димитрије Мита Митриновић; 21 October 1887 – 28 August 1953) was a Serbian philosopher, poet, revolutionary, mystic, theoretician of modern painting and traveler.

== Biography ==
=== Early life and radicalism ===
Mitrinović was born in 1887 in a Serbian Orthodox family at Donji Poplat, municipality Berkovići in Herzegovina during the Austro-Hungarian occupation. His father, Mihailo, was in the service of the Austro-Hungarian government and ran an experimental farm. Dimitrije was educated at Mostar Gymnasium. As a young student, he surrounded himself with a group that would later form the Mlada Bosna (Young Bosnia) movement, in his country's struggle for independence from Austria-Hungary and in the moves to create a united Yugoslavia.

In 1907, he went to study Philosophy in Zagreb before breaking up his studies in 1911 to join the sculptor Ivan Meštrović in Rome where he spent some time promoting his works. Mitrinović was one of the leading ideologists of Young Bosnia. In the years leading up to the First World War, he achieved prominence with his poetic writings along with his literary criticism, initially dabbling in expressionism before shifting to futurism.

During this period Mitrinović edited the Sarajevo literary paper, Bosanska Vila. Its contributors included poets Risto Radulović and Vladimir "Vlado" Gaćinović. All three are alleged to have been members of secret political societies illegal in the Austro-Hungarian Empire; only Mitrinović survived World War I. In 1913, he went to the Ludwig-Maximilians-Universität München to study art history under Heinrich Wölfflin. There he was acquainted with intellectuals Eric Gutkind, Wassily Kandinsky and Paul Klee.

Mitrinović came to England in 1914 to work for the Serbian Legation in London and moved among influential cultural circles in the country. From late 1914 to early 1915, he participated in exhibitions of Meštrović's work, which included a model of a monument he had designed to commemorate the Battle of Kosovo.

=== Career and thought ===
He began his work in the field of art by translating Rig-Veda and the works of Virgil into Serbian. He was one of the first advocates of the avant-garde artistic group Der Blaue Reiter and organized exhibitions on the work of Kandinsky. Besides art history, he also studied Philosophy while staying in Rome, Madrid, Paris, Munich, and Tübingen.

Being in favour of the building of a universal utopia, like many of the leading minds of his time, he wrote about the inevitable creation of the Pan-European community. Ten years before La rebelión de las masas by Ortega y Gasset, Mitrinović prophesied: "Being different from the other races, the population of Europe has always given birth to its contradictions and always with the chances of their solution in some ultimate synthesis."

He was a regular contributor to the epoch-making periodical The New Age (the author of the column "World Affairs"), alongside Ezra Pound, and according to Edwin Muir, Mitrinović "has erupted with wild and profound contemplations ... not looking several ages ahead, like Shaw or Wells, but several millennia ahead."

The Utopian and messianic ideas of Mitrinović (influenced by philosophical concepts of Husserl and Peter Demianovich Ouspensky, the esoteric doctrine of G. I. Gurdjieff, and the psychoanalytical school of Freud, Jung and Adler) were brought to the attention of the public not only in the periodical The New Age but also in the periodical The New Atlantis (which Mitrinović edited) and The New Albion (which he co-edited with A. R. Orage).

In 1927, Mitrinović was entrusted with the founding of the Adler's Society (the English Branch of the International Society for Individual Psychology). He and Adler later parted ways due, allegedly, to "politicizing of his [Mitrinović's] scientific concepts". Mitrinović later founded the New Europe Group.

Mitrinović advocated a metaphysical Utopia (based on Plotinus, Clement of Alexandria, Lao Tzu, Jakob Böhme) but was also politically pragmatic. He published an open letter to Adolf Hitler in 1933 in which he accused Hitler of "behaving and acting as an evil superman ... possessed with some weird vision" which is "incomprehensible for the human mind and belief and quite certainly, and in all forms and essence, directed against the Orthodox soul."

=== Writings ===
The works of Mitrinović have remained scattered in numerous European periodicals (like the provocative texts based on psychological and philosophical theories, such as: Frojd prema Adleru (Freud versus Adler), Značaj Jungovog dela (The Importance of Jung's Work), Marks i Niče kao istorijska pozadina Adlera (Marx and Nietzsche as the Historical Background of Adler), Načela genija (The Principles of Genius), Carstvo snova (The Realm of Dream). Many of his works (including much of his poetry) were published in Serbian periodicals, and one of his major works, Aesthetic Contemplations, was published in Bosanska Vila.

In addition to the selected works of Dimitrije Mitrinović (published in Serbian, a number of years after his death) and the special study by Predrag Palavestra, Dogma i utopija (Dogma and Utopia) published in Serbian in 1977), two books have been distributed by Columbia University Press, New York; the first of them was published in 1984 and the second one in 1987. The authors of these books are Andrew Rigby (Initiation and Initiative: An Exploration of the Life and Ideas of Dimitrije Mitrinović) and H. C. Rutherford (Certainly Future: Selected Writings by Dimitrije Mitrinović).

== Library and archive ==
The Mitrinović Library contains a collection of over 4,500 volumes, based on Mitrinović's private collection. The Library thus reflects Mitrinović's very wide range of interests and command of languages. Particular areas of strength are philosophy, politics, society, religions and esoterica. The collection includes rare books on art history, literature, psychology, history, science, oriental studies, astrology, Freemasonry, theosophy, and more. Most material is from the nineteenth and early twentieth century; the main languages used are English and German, with also French and some Asian and Eastern European languages.

Part of the library was bequeathed to the Belgrade University Library in 1956 and part of it donated to University of Bradford in 2003 and 2004.

The archive that was donated to the University of Bradford by the Foundation New Atlantis in 2003 and 2004 includes published and unpublished writings of Mitrinović and documents and correspondence produced by members of Mitrinović's circle, of the New Europe Group, and of the New Atlantis Foundation.

== Sources ==
- Rigby, Andrew (2006). Dimitrije Mitrinović: A Biography. William Sessions Limited. ISBN 9781850723349.
- Banac, Ivo (1988). The National Question in Yugoslavia: Origins, History, Politics. Cornell University Press. ISBN 0-8014-9493-1.
