= Vladimir Gaćinović =

Bosnian Serb writer and revolutionary

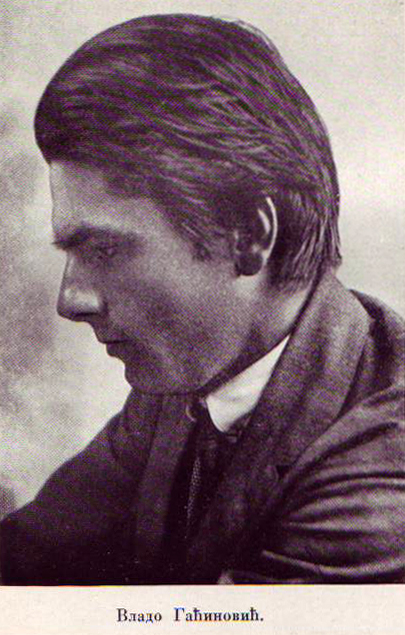
- Born: 25 May 1890; Kačanj, Bosnia and Herzegovina, Austria-Hungary
- Died: 11 August 1917 (aged 27); Fribourg, Switzerland
- Cause of death: Arsenic poisoning
- Resting place: Vidovdan Heroes Chapel, Sarajevo
- Known for: Creating Young Bosnia and being a proponent of tyrannicide

Vladimir Gaćinović (Serbian Cyrillic: Владимир Владо Гаћиновић; 25 May 1890 – 11 August 1917) was a Bosnian Serb essayist and revolutionary in Austria-Hungary. He was one of the leaders and organizers of the secret cells of the revolutionary movement Young Bosnia.

== Early life ==
Gaćinović was born in 1890 in the village of Kačanj within Bileća municipality, which was then administered by the Austro-Hungarian Condominium of Bosnia and Herzegovina (another source has his birthplace as Rudina village, also in Bileća). Gaćinović was the son of a Serbian Orthodox priest, who was also a hajduk. He completed elementary school in Bileća in 1901 and finished six grades of high school in Mostar between 1901 and 1907. The high school had been home to two secret societies since 1905, one of which, "Matica", was led by Dimitrije Mitrinović. When he was seventeen years old, Gaćinović was a member of the literary society which served as a front for "Matica", and published a critically noted essay about the raconteur Petar Kočić.

== Young Bosnia and Kosovo tyrannicide ==
"Gaćinović's friends and followers were mostly like him — quiet, young, undernourished, intense, swinging furiously between moods of sentimentality and ruthless revolutionary aggression."

— Misha Glenny

Austria-Hungary's complete annexation of Bosnia and Herzegovina in 1908 angered young revolutionaries active in that region. They rejected the conciliatory ideas of Tomáš Garrigue Masaryk and his cultural struggle within the Austrian monarchy; instead, they embraced the notion of "Kosovo tyrannicide", à la Miloš Obilić, as a method of political struggle. Gaćinović was the actual ideologue of the revolutionary movement Young Bosnia, and was thus responsible for introducing the cult of tyrannicide. Bogdan Žerajić was the first to pursue this method in practice. When Franz Joseph I of Austria visited Bosnia and Herzegovina on 3 June 1910, Žerajić had intended to attempt his assassination during his passage through Mostar, but eventually gave up his plan for unknown reasons. Žerajić attempted to assassinate Austro-Hungarian governor Marijan Varešanin in Sarajevo a week later, but killed himself when the plot failed.

Gaćinović, who was personal friends with European socialists such as Victor Serge and Julius Martov, met Leon Trotsky by chance in Paris. His revolutionary zeal impressed Trotsky. From autumn 1910 to the summer of 1912, Gaćinović was a student at Vienna University. In his late teens, after visiting the Kingdom of Serbia, Gaćinović organized underground cells, kruzoks, amongst Serbs in Bosnia and Herzegovina, Zagreb, and western Slavonia. In 1911, he became the only Young Bosnia leader to join Unification or Death, Dragutin Dimitrijević's secret society. In the same year, the term Mlada Bosna (Young Bosnia) was popularized in an article by Gaćinović, and modeled by him after Young Italy and Young Russia. In 1912, Gaćinović publicized a letter by one of his associates, with whom he fully agreed. Titled "Cry of a Desperate One" (Serbian: Крик очајника), it attacked the younger generations, in particular students at foreign universities, for lack of idealism and opportunism, petty individualism, and conformity.

During the First Balkan War, Gaćinović fought as a volunteer in the Montenegrin army. Upon his return to Bosnia, he instigated a plot to kill Oskar Potiorek, the Austrian Governor, in January 1914, but did not follow through with his own plan. Nevertheless, Gaćinović publicly condemned in his letters the subsequent assassination of Franz Ferdinand. According to some sources, this was merely an attempt to avoid prosecution for his involvement; however, other authors have it that Gaćinović was sincerely opposed to the assassination.

During World War I, Gaćinović spent time as a volunteer in the French Navy, after which he traveled to the United States to seek aid and volunteers for Serbia. He was poisoned with arsenic in August 1917 in Fribourg, Switzerland, by either the Austrians, the French, the Serbian police, or by one of Serbia's rival political factions.

== See also ==
- Anarchism in Bosnia and Herzegovina
- Gavrilo Princip
- Bogdan Žerajić
