= Narodna Odbrana =

Serbian nationalist organization

- Formation: October 8, 1908
- Type: revolutionary organization
- Purpose: Liberation of Austro-Hungarian South Slavs (Yugoslavism); Unification of ethnic Serb territories (Pan-Serbism)
- Location: Balkans
- Key people: Jovan Dučić and Branislav Nušić

Narodna Odbrana (Serbian Cyrillic: Народна одбрана, literally, "The People's Defence" or "National Defence") was a Serbian nationalist organization established on October 8, 1908, as a reaction to the Austro-Hungarian annexation of Bosnia and Herzegovina. At the time, it was concerned with the protection of ethnic Serbs in Austria-Hungary. To achieve their goals, the Narodna Odbrana spread propaganda and organized paramilitary forces.

Among the notable founders and members of the organization were Jovan Dučić and Branislav Nušić.

== Ideology ==
At the beginning of the 20th century, the Nationalist Serbs throughout the Balkans sought unification under a single state. In addition to the Kingdom of Serbia and the Principality of Montenegro, two states with predominantly ethnic Serb populations that didn't yet share a common border, many more Serbs lived within the borders of neighbouring Austria-Hungary (specifically Bosnia-Herzegovina condominium, Croatia-Slavonia, and southern part of Hungary) as well as Ottoman Empire (Bosnia Vilayet, Kosovo Vilayet, Sanjak of Novi Pazar, and to a lesser extent in parts of Monastir Vilayet and Salonica Vilayet). With the Austria-Hungarian 1908 annexation of Bosnia (where there was a heavy concentration of Serbs) as well as the resulting Annexation Crisis, the Serbs expressed a need for cultural and territorial protection, which gave rise to the Narodna Odbrana.

A 1911 pamphlet named Narodna Odbrana Izdanje Stredisnog Odbora Narodne Odbrane (Народна одбрана издање стредисног одбора народне одбране) focused on six main points:

1. Raising, inspiring, and strengthening the sentiment of nationality.
2. Registration and enlistment of volunteers.
3. Formation of volunteer units and their preparation for armed action.
4. Collection of voluntary contributions, including money and other things necessary for the realization of its task.
5. Organization, equipment, and training of special revolutionary band (Komitee), destined for special and independent military action.
6. Development of activity for the defense of the Serbian people in all other directions.

The pamphlet makes it clear that hatred of Austria-Hungary was not the aim of the group, but instead, it was a natural consequence of the desire for independence and unity within a single nation.

The Central Committee of the Narodna Odbrana was located at Belgrade.

== Balkan Wars ==
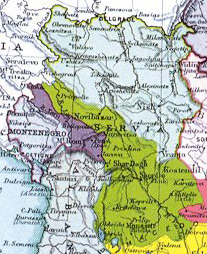
Territorial expansion of Serbia after Balkan Wars.

Immediately after the annexation of Vardar Macedonia to the Kingdom of Serbia, the Macedonians were faced with the policy of forced serbianisation. The population of Macedonia was forced to declare as Serbs. Those who refused were beaten and tortured. In Skopje, there was a central committee of "National Defense". A population of Skopje called their headquarters "Black House", after the "Black Hand", a secret organization that stood behind them. In the "black house", disloyal individuals were taken and beaten.

== Members ==
- Stepa Stepanović (president), military
- Jovan Dučić (founder), intelligentsia
- Branislav Nušić (founder), intelligentsia
- Miško Jovanović, student, also Young Bosnia
- Božidar Janković, military
- Milorad Pavlović
- Mladen Stojanović, student, also Young Bosnia
- Todor Ilić, student

== See also ==
- Black Hand
- Chetniks
- Pan-Serbism
- Pan-Slavism
- Serbian National Defense Council

== Sources ==
- Blakley, Patrick R. F. "Narodna Odbrana (The Black Hand): Terrorist Faction that Divided the World" (PDF). Oswego Historical Review. 2: 13–34.
- Bogićević, Vojislav (1938). "Narodna Odbrana i sarajevski atentat". Krug. 19. Belgrade.
- Djokić, Dejan (2003). Yugoslavism: Histories of a Failed Idea, 1918-1992. C. Hurst & Co. Publishers. ISBN 978-1-85065-663-0.
- MacKenzie, David (1982). "Serbian Nationalist and Military Organizations and the Piedmont Idea, 1844-1914". East European Quarterly. 16 (3): 323–.
- Stanojević, Stanoje (1928). "Narodna enciklopedija srpsko-hrvatsko-slovenačka". 3: 15.
