= Tyrannicide =

Killing of a tyrant or unjust ruler

Tyrannicide or tyrannomachia is the killing or assassination of a tyrant or unjust ruler. Tyrannicide was heavily encouraged in Classical Greece. The killing of Clearchus of Heraclea in 353 BC by a cohort led by his own court philosopher is an example of a tyrannicide. A person who carries out a tyrannicide is also called a "tyrannicide".

The term originally denoted the action of Harmodius and Aristogeiton, who are often called the Tyrannicides, in killing Hipparchus of Athens in 514 BC.

== Political theory ==
Tyrannicide can also be a political theory and, as an allegedly justified form of the crime of murder, a dilemmatic case in the philosophy of law, and as such dates from antiquity. Support for tyrannicide can be found in Plutarch's Lives, Cicero's De Officiis, and Seneca's Hercules Furens. Plato describes a violent tyrant as the opposite of a good and "true king" in the Statesman, and while Aristotle in the Politics sees it as opposed to all other beneficial forms of government, he also described tyrannicide mainly as an act by those wishing to gain personally from the tyrant's death, while those who act without hope of personal gain or to make a name for themselves are rare.

Various Christian philosophers and theologians also wrote about tyrannicide. In late antiquity, they debated whether the Bible justified tyrannicide. Passages such as the Books of the Maccabees, Daniel 7:27, and Acts 5:29 seemed to justify the practice while others such as Romans 13, Exodus 22:27–28, Proverbs 8:15, and 1 Peter 2:13–18 seemed to condemn it. Theologians were also inspired by rumors of Emperor Julian the Apostate, the final pagan Roman Emperor, being killed by a Christian. During the Middle Ages, most theologians were influenced on the subject by Augustine of Hippo's The City of God, which said that Christians should obey secular authority. John of Salisbury was the first medieval Christian scholar to defend tyrannicide.

In Thomas Aquinas's commentary on the Sentences of Peter Lombard, Aquinas gave a defense not only of disobedience to an unjust authority, using as an example Christian martyrs in the Roman Empire, but also of "one who liberates his country by killing a tyrant." The Monarchomachs in particular developed a theory of tyrannicide, with Juan de Mariana describing their views in the 1598 work De rege et regis institutione, in which he wrote, "[B]oth the philosophers and theologians agree, that the prince who seizes the state with force and arms, and with no legal right, no public, civic approval, may be killed by anyone and deprived of his life..."

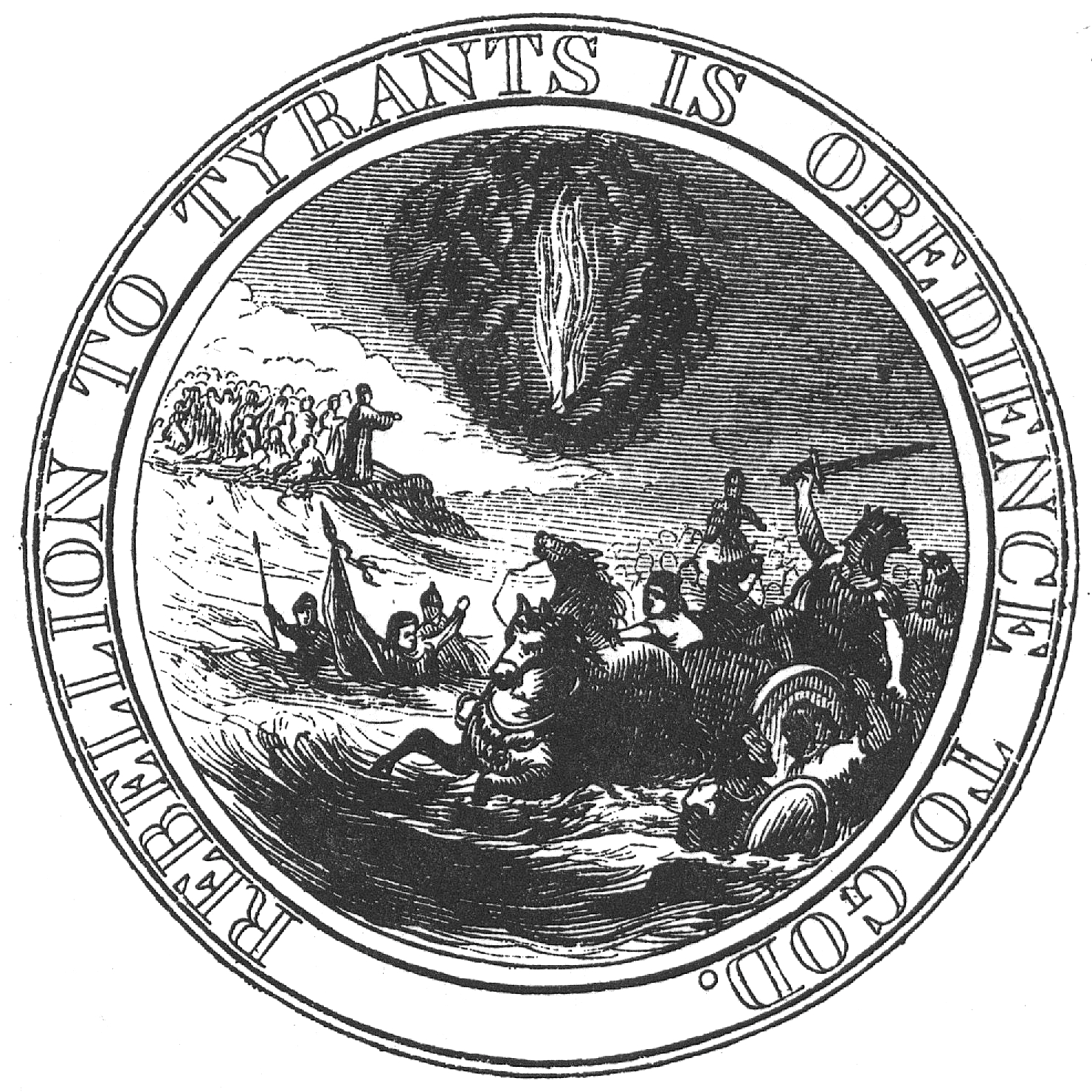
Benjamin Franklin's suggestion for the Great Seal of the United States included the phrase "Rebellion to Tyrants is Obedience to God."

The Jesuistic casuistry developed a similar theory, criticized by Blaise Pascal in the Provincial Letters. Before them, the scholastic philosopher John of Salisbury also legitimised tyrannicide, under specific conditions, in the Policraticus, circa 1159. His theory was derived from his idea of the state as a political organism in which all the members cooperate actively in the realization of the common utility and justice. He held that when the ruler of this body politic behaves tyrannically, failing to perform his characteristic responsibilities, the other limbs and organs are bound by their duty to the public welfare and God to correct and, ultimately, to slay the tyrant.

In 1408, the theologian Jean Petit used biblical examples to justify tyrannicide following the murder of Louis I, Duke of Orleans by Petit's patron John the Fearless, Duke of Burgundy. Petit's thesis was extensively discussed and eventually anathematized by the church at the Council of Constance. A Shone Treatise of Politike Power, written by John Ponet in 1556, argued that the people are custodians of natural and divine law, and that if governors and kings violated their trust, then they forfeited their power, whether they relinquished their positions voluntarily or whether they had to be removed forcefully. The Tenure of Kings and Magistrates by John Milton in 1649 also described the history of tyrannicide, and a defense of it when appropriate.

Cambridge's David George has also argued that terrorism is a form of tyranny of which tyrannicide is a negation. Abraham Lincoln believed that assassinating a leader is morally justified when a people has suffered under a tyrant for an extended period of time and has exhausted all legal and peaceful means of ouster.

== History ==
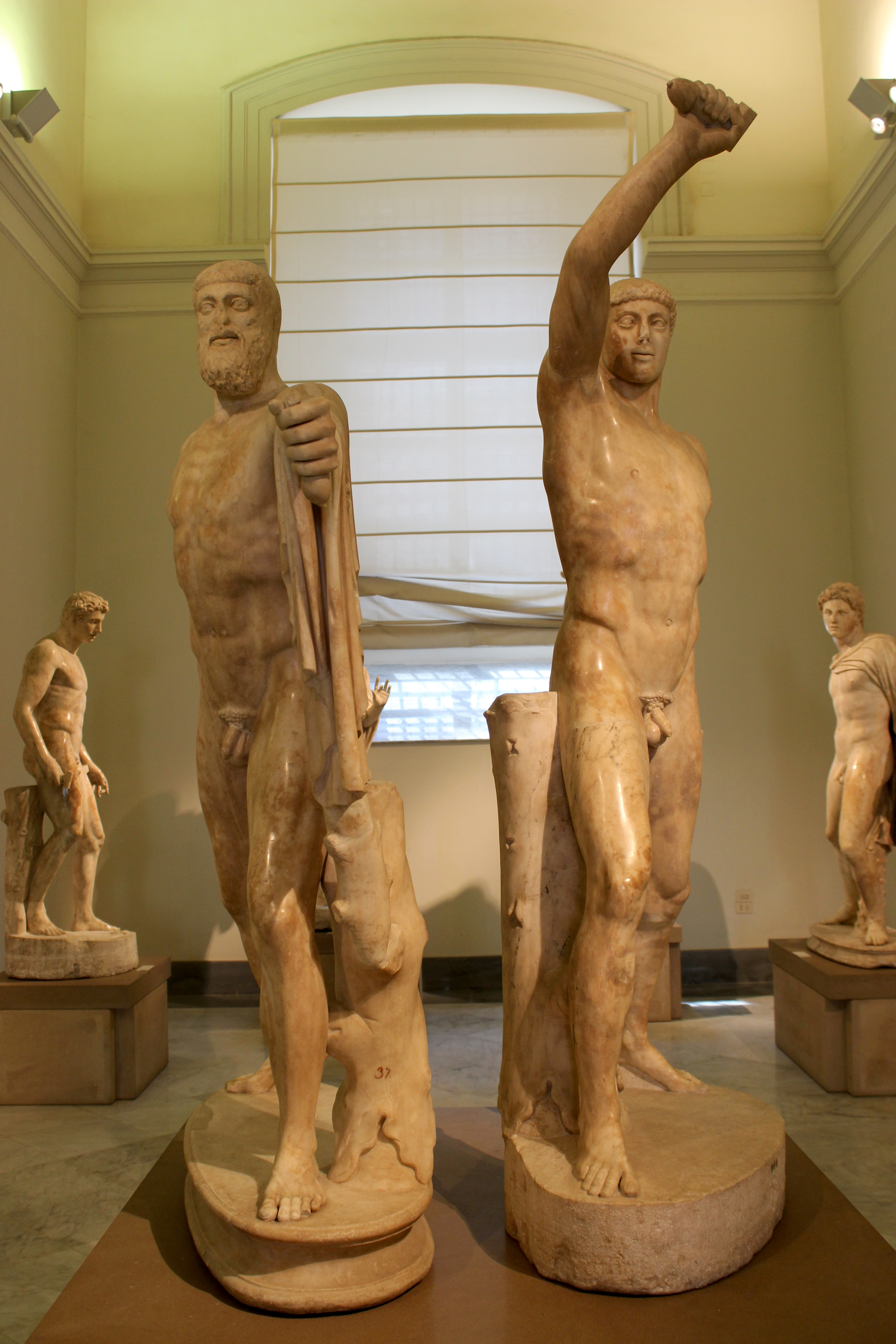
Statue of Harmodius and Aristogeiton

Throughout history, many leaders have died under the pretext of tyrannicide. Hipparchus, one of the last Greek leaders to use the title of "tyrant", was assassinated in 514 BC by Harmodius and Aristogeiton, the original tyrannicides. Since then "tyrant" has been a pejorative term, lacking objective criteria. Many rulers and heads of state have been considered tyrannical by their enemies but not by their supporters. For example, when John Wilkes Booth assassinated Abraham Lincoln in 1865, he wrote that he considered Lincoln a tyrant while comparing himself to Marcus Junius Brutus, who stabbed the Roman dictator Julius Caesar in 44 BC. Booth famously shouted "Sic semper tyrannis!" during the assassination.

Several of Caesar's successors (Roman Emperors) came to their demise by assassinations, including Caligula, who was stabbed in 41 by Cassius Chaerea and other Praetorian Guards, and Domitian, stabbed in 96 by a steward of Flavia Domitilla named Stephanus. Many attempts on Commodus's life in the late 2nd century failed, including the one instigated by his own sister Lucilla, but he ultimately fell victim to his own excess by a successful murderous coup. Other emperors assassinated from within include Caracalla, Elagabalus, Marcus Aurelius Marius, and Severus Alexander. After the fall of the Western Roman Empire, tyrannicide continued in the Eastern Roman Empire when Emperor Andronikos I Komnenos was tied to a pillar, beaten, and dismembered by a mob in 1185.

Tyrannicide has also been connected to revolution, with many taking place during successful revolutions, and others sparking revolutionary upheavals. In the midst of the French Revolution, Maximilien Robespierre took power as the President of the National Convention, but after leading the Reign of Terror from 1793 to 1794, he was executed by beheading by the National Convention. Russian Tsar Nicholas II was executed by the Bolsheviks as an enemy of the people in 1918, following the 1917 October Revolution. The Romanian Revolution, one of the Revolutions of 1989, enabled a group of defected Romanian People's Army soldiers to capture Nicolae Ceauşescu, the country's communist leader, and to stage a trial after which he was executed by a firing squad of paratroopers Ionel Boeru, Georghin Octavian and Dorin-Marian Cirlan.

Many assassins have been killed in the act, such as Rigoberto López Pérez, who shot Nicaraguan dictator Anastasio Somoza García in 1956. Claus von Stauffenberg tried to kill Adolf Hitler on 20 July 1944, was sentenced to death by an impromptu court martial and executed a few hours after the attempted murder. Others were prosecuted for the killing: Antonio de la Maza and his conspirators were executed after their shooting of Rafael Trujillo, dictator of the Dominican Republic in 1961, as was Kim Jaegyu, who shot South Korean dictator Park Chung Hee in 1979. Five of the members of Young Bosnia who were involved with the assassination of Archduke Franz Ferdinand in Sarajevo were sentenced to death by hanging, while eleven were sentenced to various years in prison, including Gavrilo Princip who fired the fatal shot. Khalid Islambouli was one of three members of Egyptian Islamic Jihad executed for the assassination of Anwar Sadat, the autocratic President of Egypt in 1981. Even both Hipparchus's assassins were themselves killed, Harmodius on the spot and Aristogeiton after being tortured, and the major conspirators in the plot to kill Caesar were likewise killed or forced to commit suicide.

Outright revolt was the context for other tyrannicides and allowed individual killers to escape or remain anonymous. During World War II and the Italian resistance movement, Walter Audisio claimed to have led his team of partisans in the abduction and execution by firing squad of Benito Mussolini in 1945. The circumstances remain clouded, though Audisio was later elected to both the Italian Chamber of Deputies and the Italian Senate. In 1990, Samuel Doe, the President of Liberia, was tortured to his death. In 1996, during their takeover of Afghanistan, Taliban soldiers captured Mohammad Najibullah, the President of the Soviet-backed Democratic Republic of Afghanistan and dragged him to death. Saddam Hussein, President of Iraq, was executed in 2006. During the 2011 Libyan civil war, Libyan leader Muammar Gaddafi, the self-titled "Brotherly Leader and Guide of the Revolution", was killed in the Battle of Sirte, in unclear circumstances.

== Literature ==
Tyrannicide is a popular literary trope. Besides Julius Caesar, a number of William Shakespeare's plays deal with the subject, including Hamlet, Macbeth, and Richard III. Friedrich Schiller based the play William Tell and the ballad Die Bürgschaft on existing legends of tyrannicide. The Italian dramatist, poet and philosopher Vittorio Alfieri devoted much of his work to this issue.

== See also ==
- Regicide
- Assassination
- Sic semper tyrannis

== Bibliography ==
- Borge, Tomás (1982). Sandinistas Speak. Pathfinder Press. ISBN 0-87348-619-6.
- Booth, John Wilkes (2000). Right Or Wrong, God Judge Me: The Writings of John Wilkes Booth. University of Illinois Press. ISBN 0-252-06967-6.
- Diederich, Bernard (1990). Trujillo: The Death of The Goat. Waterfront Press. ISBN 0-943862-44-2.
- Graubard, Stephen Richards (1999). A new Europe for the old?. Vol. 126. Transaction Publishers. ISBN 0-7658-0465-4.
- Law, Randall David (2009). Terrorism: a history (illustrated ed.). Polity. p. 18. ISBN 978-0-7456-4038-9.
- Voegelin, Eric; Von Sivers, Peter (1989). The collected works of Eric Voegelin. University of Missouri Press. ISBN 0-8262-1142-9.
