= Marijan Varešanin =

Croatian nobleman and general in Habsburg service (1847–1917)

Baron Marijan Varešanin
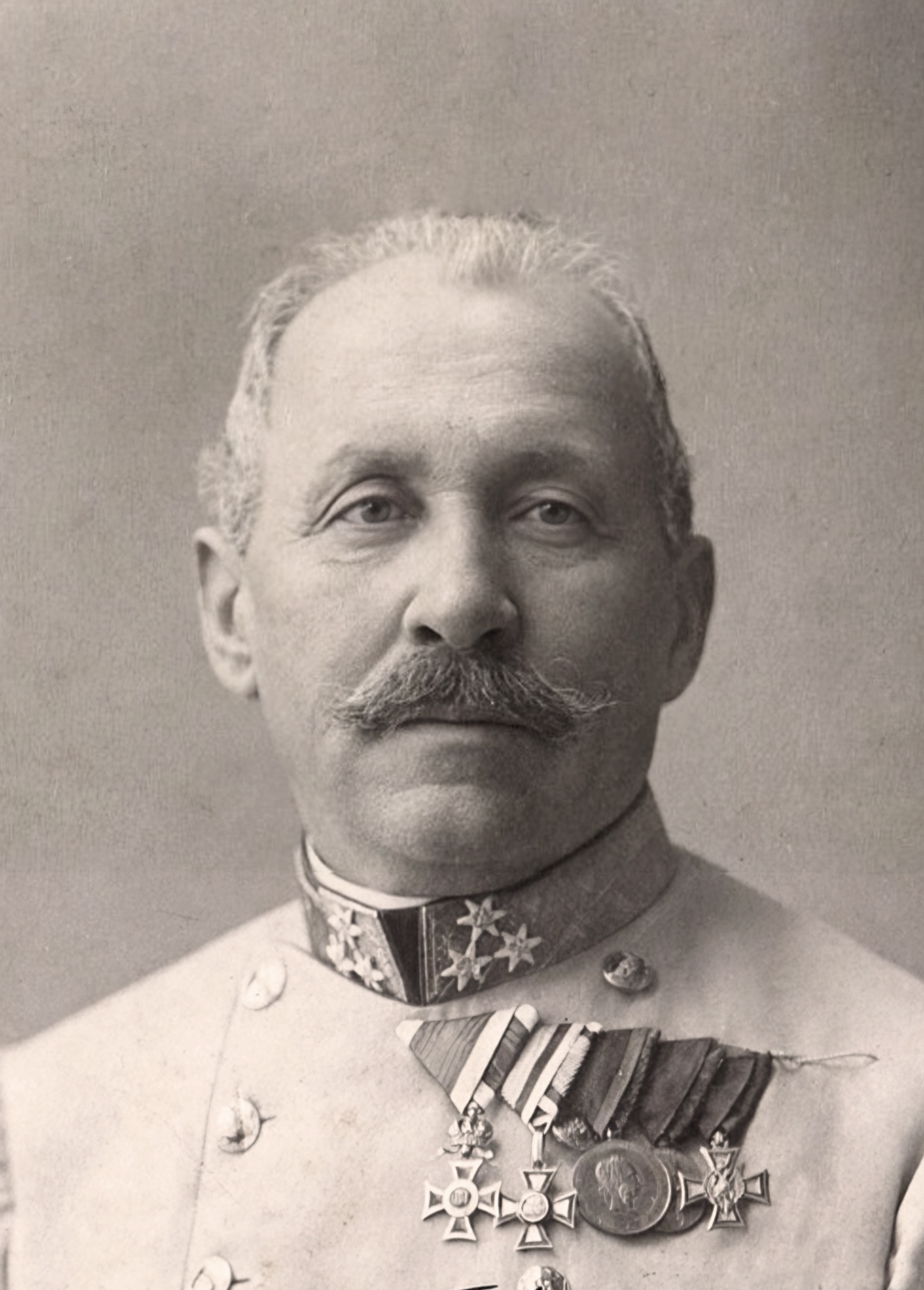

7th Governor of Bosnia and Herzegovina
- In office 7 March 1909 – 10 May 1911
- Appointed by: Franz Joseph I of Austria
- Preceded by: Anton von Winzor
- Succeeded by: Oskar Potiorek

Personal details
- Born: 1 February 1847 Gunja, Kingdom of Slavonia, Austrian Empire
- Died: 22 April 1917 (aged 70) Vienna, Austria-Hungary
- Education: Theresian Military Academy Kreigsschule
- Profession: Soldier

Military service
- Allegiance: Austrian Empire (until 1867) Austria-Hungary (1867–1911)
- Branch/service: Austro-Hungarian Army
- Years of service: 1866–1911
- Rank: General der Infanterie
- Battles/wars: World War I

Marijan Varešanin von Varesch (1 February 1847 – 22 April 1917) was a Croatian nobleman and general in the Habsburg monarchy imperial army service. He was the governor of Bosnia and Herzegovina from 1909 to 1911.

== Life ==
Varešanin was born in Gunja in Slavonia (now Croatia) and was the son of a military officer. He attended cadet school in Rijeka and later joined Theresian Military Academy in Wiener Neustadt. On 19 August 1866, he earned the rank of lieutenant of an infantry regiment. Between 1869 and 1871, he attended Kriegsschule in Vienna and graduated with honours.

On 7 March 1909, he was named as commander of the 15th Corps stationed in Sarajevo and as governor of Bosnia and Herzegovina. On 29 July, he was named as chief inspector of military troops. Soon, the command of the 15th Corps was handed over to Moritz von Auffenberg. However, Varešanin remained the governor of Bosnia and Herzegovina and so was targeted by a lone Bosnia youth after the Austro-Hungarian annexation of Bosnia. In 1910 he was titled baron.

On 15 June 1910 an assassination attempt was made on him by Bogdan Žerajić, who fired five bullets from a revolver on Varešanin and killed himself with the sixth.

The assassination attempt served as inspiration for Gavrilo Princip, who visited Žerajić's grave where he promised to take revenge. He did so by killing Archduke Franz Ferdinand in Sarajevo on 28 June 1914.

After the assassination attempt, Varešanin started to think about retiring. On 10 May 1911, his request for dismissal as governor was accepted, and he was replaced by Oskar Potiorek. On 10 July, he officially retired, after 45 years of service.
