= Moravian German dialects =

Dialects of German spoken in Moravia

- Deutschmährische Mundarten
- Native to: Czech Republic, Slovakia
- Region: Moravia and Czech Silesia
- Language family: Germanic languages: West Germanic; German; Moravian German dialects

Language codes
- ISO 639-3: –
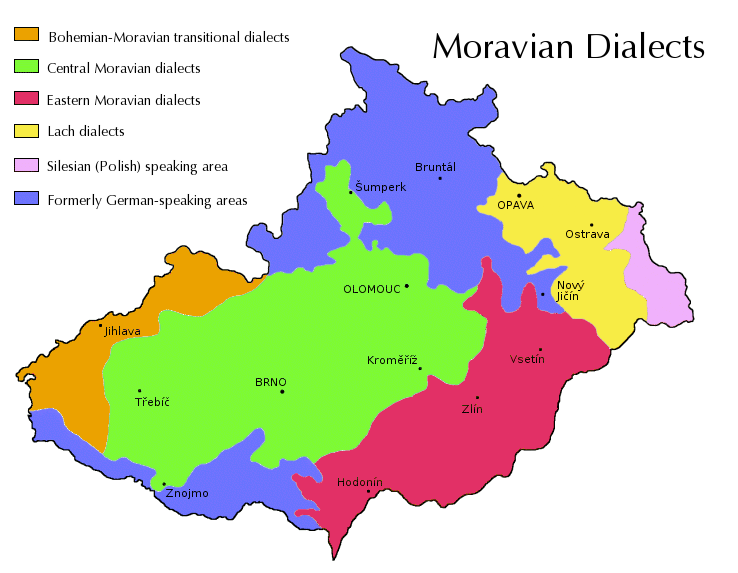
- Map of Moravia and Czech Silesia (borders between the two regions not shown) indicating the major dialect groups: Central Moravian dialects Eastern Moravian dialects Lach dialects Bohemian-Moravian dialects Cieszyn Silesian speaking area Areas of Moravian German dialects

Moravian German dialects were moribund dialects of German spoken in Moravia in what is now the Czech Republic. Speakers of the dialect were largely expelled after 1945. Those who could stay had to assimilate and mostly did not pass the language to their children; they speak mostly Standard German aside from Czech.

== Dialect area ==
The German-speaking areas of northern Moravia were part of the closed German-language area via their connection to then German-settled Silesia. A part of this contiguous German-speaking area belonged to Moravia and the other, northern part to Czech Silesia, but linguistically the areas must be considered as a whole. The area stretched from the Golden Mountains at the tip of Kłodzko via Javorník, Mikulášovice, Zlaté Hory, Osoblaha, Krnov almost as far as Opava and from Šumperk in the south via Uničov, Šternberk, Odry, Fulnek, Suchdol nad Odrou, Nový Jičín and Studénka almost as far as Opava.

The Hrubý Jeseník mountains extend within this area from north to south and divide it into a western and an eastern part which were connected by way of south. Other centers within this area were Jeseník, Bruntál, Vrbno pod Pradědem, Rýmařov, Vitkov, Budišov nad Budišovkou and Moravský Beroun.

In southern Moravia, German was spoken in a strip north of the present Czech–Austrian border, notably in Slavonice, Mikulov and Znojmo and Břeclav

The dialect area can also be seen as comprising the language islands Jihlava, Brno, Vyškov, Olomouc, Skřípov/Brodek u Přerova, the Hřebečsko region and the Hlučín Region.

In the German communities of this area, the Czech share of the population was very small, while in the Czech communities the German share was likewise. However, this situation was different in towns, where language groups were more mixed. For example, Opava formed a German language island but with a large Czech population, as Czech villages were located all around. However, the German-speaking area began just a few kilometers to west, south, and northwest.

In 1930, 750,000 Germans lived in the entire linguistically contiguous area of North Moravia and Silesia.

== History ==
Larger numbers of German-speaking settlers arrived during the medieval Ostsiedlung, particularly at the initiative of Bishop Bruno of Schauenburg (1245–1281). Medieval charters however contain no hint at the regions of origin of the German settlers, so that it is ultimately the language that can indicate the origin and territorial affiliation of the former German colonists by comparison with the native dialects.

In the 19th century, as Moravia modernized as a part of the Austrian Empire, Czech nationalism grew, intellectually developed as a combination of noble provincial particularism and historical revivalism. In turn, a political German nationalism developed in Austria. German liberals believed that their predominance had a universal basis in the values of constitutionalism, parliamentary government and rule of law. The Germans' views began shifting to alleged racial and cultural superiority. Czech nationalism eventually turned just as radical as German nationalism.

In the second half of the 18th century, there were many attempts in Bohemia and Moravia to find a compromise between the two nations. According to the eventually unsuccessful Kremsier Constitution, the historical regions of the empire should remain, but they should be further subdivided along ethnic boundaries. The idea of ethnic division of Moravia was accepted by many German parties, but was strongly opposed by the Czech.

At the Versailles Conference, the Czech delegation misrepresented the Moravian Germans as settling scattered over the whole country.

== Dialect properties ==
Moravian German represents a unique German dialect entity that had arisen over centuries by a mixture of different German dialects, as settlers from different regions arrived here. Linguistic literature before the Second World War presented North Moravia together with the then German-speaking Silesia as a dialectal area of Silesian German, which hence covered a huge territory stretching from Lusatia to Moravia. According to divisions, North Moravian German was classified as "Southern Silesian", which also includes the variety spoken in the Schönhengstgau (Hřebečsko) as a subgroup.

== Notable speakers ==
German public authors from the region include Ralph Benatzky, Alfred Brendel, the writer Marie von Ebner-Eschenbach and the painter Adolf Hölzel, who all were born in Moravia. The poets Rainer Maria Rilke and Peter Härtling went to school here.

== Documentation of the dialect ==
- Armin R. Bachmann, Alois Dicklberger, Albrecht Greule, Monika Wese, Mojmir Muzikant, Armin Bachmann, Albrecht Greule, Hermann Scheuringer 'Atlas der deutschen Mundarten in Tschechien, Narr Francke Attempto Verlag, Tübingen
- Mojmír Muzikant, Richard Rothenhagen, Kleiner mährischer Sprachatlas der deutschen Dialekte /Malý jazykový atlas německých dialektů na Moravě a ve Slezsku, Masarykova Univ., 2011
