= Ultimatum of July 23, 1914 =

Austro-Hungarian ultimatum to Serbia issued in the buildup to World War I

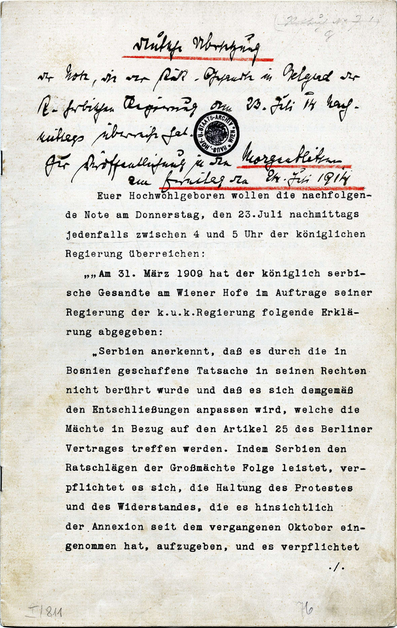
Copy of the ultimatum

The ultimatum of July 23, 1914, was a diplomatic note delivered by the Austro-Hungarian ambassador in Belgrade to the Serbian Minister of Finance. The issuance of the ultimatum is widely seen as an immediate precursor to the outbreak of World War I in August 1914. The note was Austria-Hungary's response to the assassination of Archduke Franz Ferdinand by Serbia-aligned perpetrators the previous month, following weeks of deliberation.

The text was meticulously constructed to be unacceptable to the Serbian government, thereby ensuring its rejection and thus adding to Austria-Hungary's casus belli. Serbia's response was dismissed by the Austro-Hungarian government.

An agreement between Austria-Hungary and its principal ally, the German Empire, (Note: The German Imperial Constitution of 1871 gave the new German state the name Deutsches Reich.) had been reached as early as July 7 (see July Crisis). (Note: Historian Fritz Fischer describes the Reich's agreement as a "blank check.")

== General context ==
=== The Sarajevo assassination ===
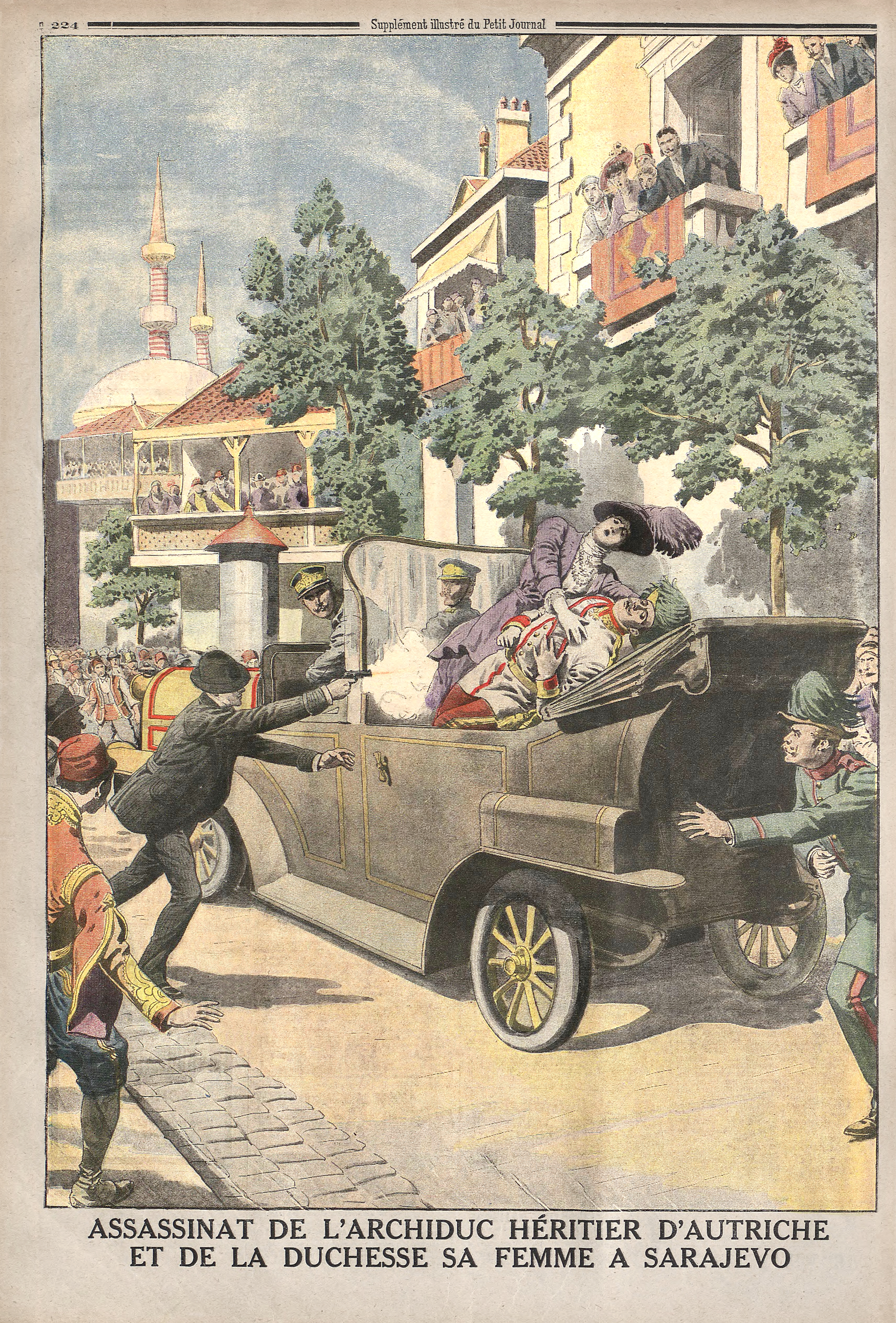
Illustrated supplement to the Petit Journal of July 12, 1914: the assassination of the Crown Archduke Franz Ferdinand and his wife.

On June 28, 1914, Archduke Franz Ferdinand, heir to the thrones of Austria and Hungary, was assassinated alongside his wife, Sophie Chotek, while attending Austro-Hungarian Army maneuvers in Bosnia-Herzegovina. The attack, carried out by Gavrilo Princip, a young Yugoslav nationalist, occurred during the couple's visit to Sarajevo, the provincial capital of annexed Bosnia and Herzegovina. Princip's actions were organized by Bosnian Serbs who had been Austro-Hungarian subjects since 1909. The murder was the culmination of a decade of attacks on high Austro-Hungarian officials in the southern Slavic territories of the Dual Monarchy.

The Austro-Hungarian police force investigated the assassination. Their preliminary findings blamed ethnic Serb nationals of the Kingdom of Serbia. The investigators lacked definitive proof in 1914 but, in 1919, after hostilities ended, the involvement of the Serbian secret society The Black Hand was unequivocally revealed.

=== Austro-Hungarian suspicions ===
Austro-Hungarian authorities suspected the Kingdom of Serbia's role in the attack before their investigation began. Investigators uncovered a plot with conspirators in both Bosnia-Herzegovina and Serbia, and revealed the involvement of the Serbian Black Hand—an organization headed by chief of Serbian military intelligence Dragutin Dimitrijević.

Investigators believed that the perpetrators were aided by Kingdom of Serbia military personnel and border guards in both preparing for the attack and in the exfiltration of accomplices, many of whom were still presumed at large after the assassination. Austrian diplomats in Serbia also observed a discrepancy between official expressions of condolence and the public's reaction to the Archduke's murder. (Note: ordinary Serbian citizens were seen to celebrate.)

The Dual Monarchy anticipated a major crisis in the Balkan Peninsula months before the assassination. By at least as early as the beginning of 1914, intelligence sources reported that Tsar Nicholas II favored a conflict with the Dual Monarchy, and were certain that the anticipated crisis would erupt before the year's end. Their assessment was corroborated by assets and agents in Bosnia-Herzegovina during the June investigation.

Russia had progressively marginalized Austria-Hungary in the region since the two Balkan Wars. Bulgaria, allied with the Dual Monarchy, suffered a decisive defeat in the Second War.

=== Serbia, the "Piedmont of the South Slavs" ===
By the turn of the 19th century, Austria-Hungary's eastern and southern possessions were restive, and nationalism was on the rise everywhere.

The Kingdom of Serbia worried Vienna since it had unilaterally declared its independence in 1878. The Serbian Obrenović dynasty had been a client of Austria-Hungary until its violent dissolution in the 1903 May Coup. The new monarch Peter I, with the backing of the Serbian Radical Party, pivoted to a French alliance. Serbia's victory in the Balkan Wars of 1913 only heightened nationalist fervor in Belgrade. Serbia was transforming from a middling state to a rapidly growing power with close ties to Russia; Austria-Hungary and the German Empire were determined to force it back into lockstep with the Central Powers. Meanwhile, the Romanian government in Bucharest, a traditional ally of the Dual Monarchy, was now pivoting to Serbia's position against the Bulgarians, who made no secret of their territorial ambitions in Romania.

Nationalist, ethnic, and religious tensions within the Dual Monarchy also intensified. In 1905, South Slavic representatives in regional assemblies within the Austrian-Hungarian Empire began to form voting blocs in parliaments in Dalmatia and Croatia. In 1908, one such coalition attained a majority in the Sabor (Croatian Parliament) in Zagreb.

In the early months of 1914, Serbia, too, was beset by internal strife. Crown Prince Alexander—who had been made regent because of his father's weakened state—feuded with his military, while Prime Minister Nikola Pašić held de facto executive power. Pašić's participation in the parliamentary elections of August 14, 1914, only exacerbated tensions in Belgrade.

=== The position of the central powers in 1914 ===
By 1914, the German Empire could no longer keep small Balkan states such as Romania, Bulgaria, and Greece within its orbit. The Balkan Wars had exacted a toll on these kingdoms, and their governments sought financial support from outside sources in rebuilding or in bids to reclaim territories lost to the victors. Neither Germany nor Austria-Hungary offered more than token commitments. (Note: The King of Greece only received the marshal's baton in Berlin; he secured credits for his country's much-needed development in London and Paris.)

German economic influence in the Ottoman Empire had also been undermined. By the autumn of 1913, the Sublime Porte could no longer secure funding from struggling German banks despite its pro-German stance. Like the Greek king, the Porte turned instead to markets in London and Paris for loans. On May 29, 1914, Karl Helfferich, a representative of Deutsche Bank, sent an alarming memorandum to Chancellor Theobald von Bethmann Hollweg highlighting the Reich's waning status in the Porte. Germany arranged short-term assistance for its dependent allies in June 1914, but its bankers deemed this insufficient to offset future demands on the Reich's treasury.

By the spring of 1914 the Dual Monarchy remained Germany's sole reliable ally; the small Balkan states were increasingly estranged from their erstwhile partners. Vienna's foreign minister, Leopold Berchtold, commissioned a report on developments in the Balkans since the 1913 wars. A draft delivered on June 23, 1914, advised against any alliance with Romania, advocated for a more aggressive stance against Serbia, and supported an alliance with Bulgaria and the Porte against Belgrade. Five days later, Serbian nationalists assassinated the Archduke in Sarajevo.

== July 7 – 23, 1914: Intense preparations ==
In the wake of the assassination of Archduke Franz Ferdinand, Austria-Hungary's devised a meticulously orchestrated response in collaboration with the German Reich, aimed at Serbia. (Note: In 1914, the Dual Monarchy could not risk a European war alone without the Reich's support.)

=== The German "blank check" ===
Despite differing perspectives among Austrians and Hungarians, the leaders of the Austro-Hungarian Empire agreed on the importance of seeking counsel from Germany.

On July 2, Austro-Hungarian diplomats were promptly informed of Kaiser Wilhelm II's stance. The German ambassador in Vienna urged Berchtold to act with prudence and cautioned him against hastily assigning blame on the Serbian government.

On July 4, German diplomats briefed their counterparts in Vienna on the Kaiser's position. Wilhelm II conveyed his personal support for his ally in a statement that reiterated positions he had taken the previous autumn. (Note: in October 1913, an Ultimatum of 18 October 1913 forced Serbia to withdraw its troops from occupied territories in Albania.) He expressed his willingness to back the Dual Monarchy should it take decisive action against Serbia. Support was formally confirmed to the Austro-Hungarian envoy on July 6, 1914.

On July 5, Count Hoyos arrived in Berlin, seeking German support for Austro-Hungarian measures against Belgrade. He carried a handwritten letter from Franz Joseph to Wilhelm II and a memorandum that was highly critical of Serbia.

In the days following the assassination, Wilhelm II had held extensive consultations with his ministers and advisors; their response was to be positive. Reassured by the Kaiser, (Note: Hoyos returned to Vienna on July 7.) Austro-Hungarian leaders began preparing their measures against Serbia. German officials now urged swift action to capitalize on the outrage sparked by the attack. To limit the oncoming Austro-Serbian conflict, Germany also courted Serbia's potential allies in a bid to steer them away from aiding Belgrade.

Wilhelm II assured the Romanians that the Central Powers would respect their sovereign neutrality in the event of any Austro-Serbian conflict. Bulgaria, the Central Powers' newest member, had recently threatened to invade Romania's southern flank, further guaranteeing Romanian neutrality.

In a statement made on July 21 and 22—one day before the issuance of the ultimatum—Reich Chancellor Theobald von Bethmann Hollweg expressed his view that the Austro-Hungarian note to Serbia was "fair and moderate." On July 24, a circular from the German Foreign Ministry instructed Reich ambassadors to underscore the bilateral nature of the Austro-Serbian dispute.

Moreover, Germany's ambassador in Vienna, Heinrich Leonard von Tschirschky und Bögendorff, exerted considerable influence over the Austro-Hungarian monarchy through his daily interactions and frequent meetings with key policymakers. He advocated for a robust response as a means of restoring the monarchy's waning prestige. It was assumed by officials from both the Reich and Austria-Hungary that a rapid offensive, limited to the capture of Belgrade and its surroundings, would present the Triple Entente with a fait accompli. (Note: In the event, however, the Triple Entente was not willing to accept any such outcome.)

=== The different centers of power in Austria-Hungary (July 7–23) ===
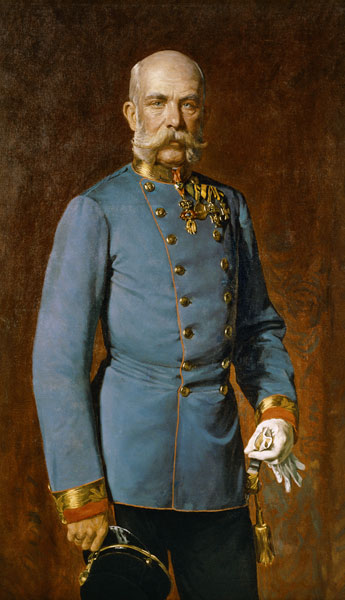
Franz Josef I of Austria.

Throughout the crisis, various institutions within the Dual Monarchy exerted contradictory pressures on Austro-Hungarian foreign policy. The common War Minister Alexander von Krobatin, Foreign Minister Berchtold, and Chief of the General Staff Franz Conrad von Hötzendorf all advocated for prompt military action. However, they encountered resistance from Hungarian Prime Minister István Tisza, who did not want the Dual Monarchy to be seen abroad as the aggressor.

Emperor Franz Joseph endorsed a resolute policy towards Serbia. Despite his disinclination towards his slain nephew and successor, the Emperor was determined to safeguard his dynasty and his dominions from any external encroachment. The emperor had the support of powerful friends including Alexander Hoyos, Janos Forgach, Alexander von Musulin, and Franz von Matscheko, as well as the Chief of Staff Conrad von Hötzendorf and Foreign Minister Berchtold. Collectively, these figures exerted considerable influence which enabled the emperor in his confrontation with Serbia. The emperor insisted on establishing the involvement of Serbian intelligence in the assassination to secure Berlin's support before any Austro-Hungarian initiative, and to persuade Tisza to approve military action against the Kingdom of Belgrade.

Tisza feared a violent response by minority Slav populations in Hungary to any military action against Serbia. His stance put him at odds with other officials in the Dual Monarchy. From the outset, he encountered resistance from the military, particularly from Conrad, who wanted a swift assault on Belgrade without an ultimatum or declaration of war. Tisza persisted throughout the Austro-Hungarian Council of Ministers on July 7 and in the subsequent days until July 14. He invoked a memorandum he had drafted on June 30 outlining his position on the matter. On July 7 he put forth an alternative diplomatic solution that aimed to bolster alliances with Bulgaria and Romania. His strategy sought to isolate Belgrade and compel Serbian leaders to concede to Austro-Hungarian demands. Tisza ultimately relented to the majority and gave his consent to their demands on July 14. German ambassador Heinrich von Tschirschky sent the news to Berlin on the same day.

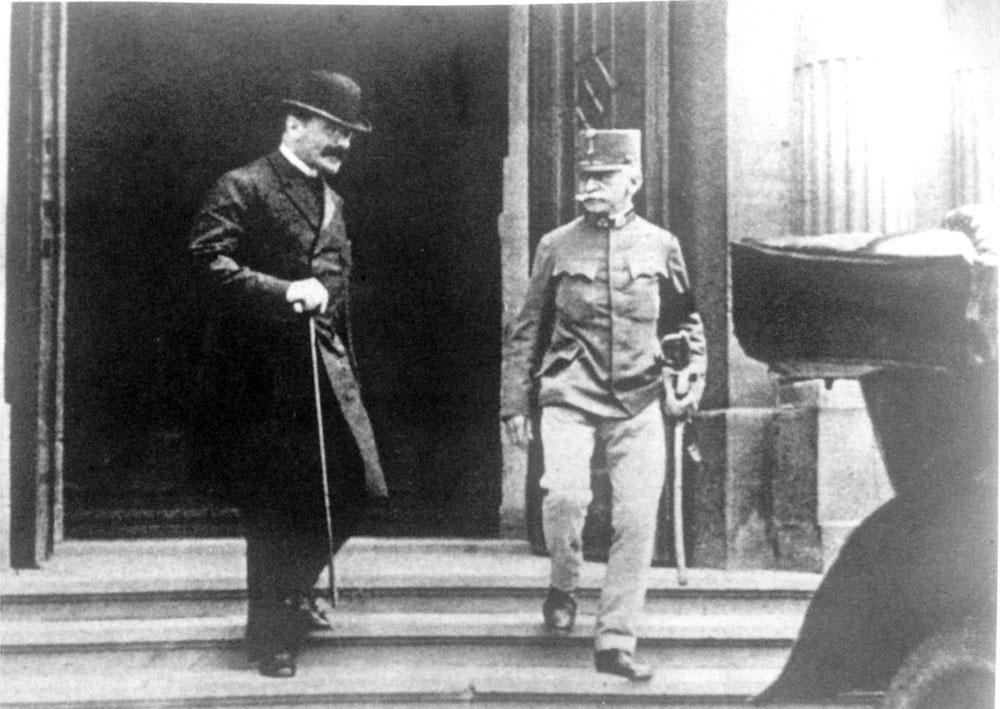
István Tisza and Franz Conrad von Hötzendorf, in Vienna, July 15, 1914.

During a joint council of ministers in Vienna on July 19, Tisza dropped his remaining objections after consulting with his close associate Stephan Burián von Rajecz. He also had Conrad's guarantee—contrary to Berchtold's concerns—that the monarchy would not emerge from the conflict without territorial gains and that Hungarian Transylvania would be safeguarded against potential Romanian offensives. Bulgaria would also receive annexed Serbian territories. This did not resolve all of Tisza's objections, however. His objections were substantial: Romania's likely demands for compensation for their neutrality; Bulgaria's future as an expanded state; the successor to the Karageorgevic dynasty; and the prospect of Russian intervention and its military consequences.

Relations between allies grew tense. Austro-Hungarian officials stopped communicating their plans to their German counterparts through July 22, the day before the ultimatum was delivered. The Austro-Hungarians objected to the conduct of the German diplomats and found reason to question the German Secretary of State's ability to maintain secrecy.

In the weeks leading up to the ultimatum, the Austro-Hungarian intelligence service underwent a transformation. The largely passive information-gathering network became a security apparatus that actively engaged in espionage, monitoring and censorship of communications (post, telephone, and telegraph), and counterintelligence.

=== The kingdom of Serbia in the aftermath of the assassination ===
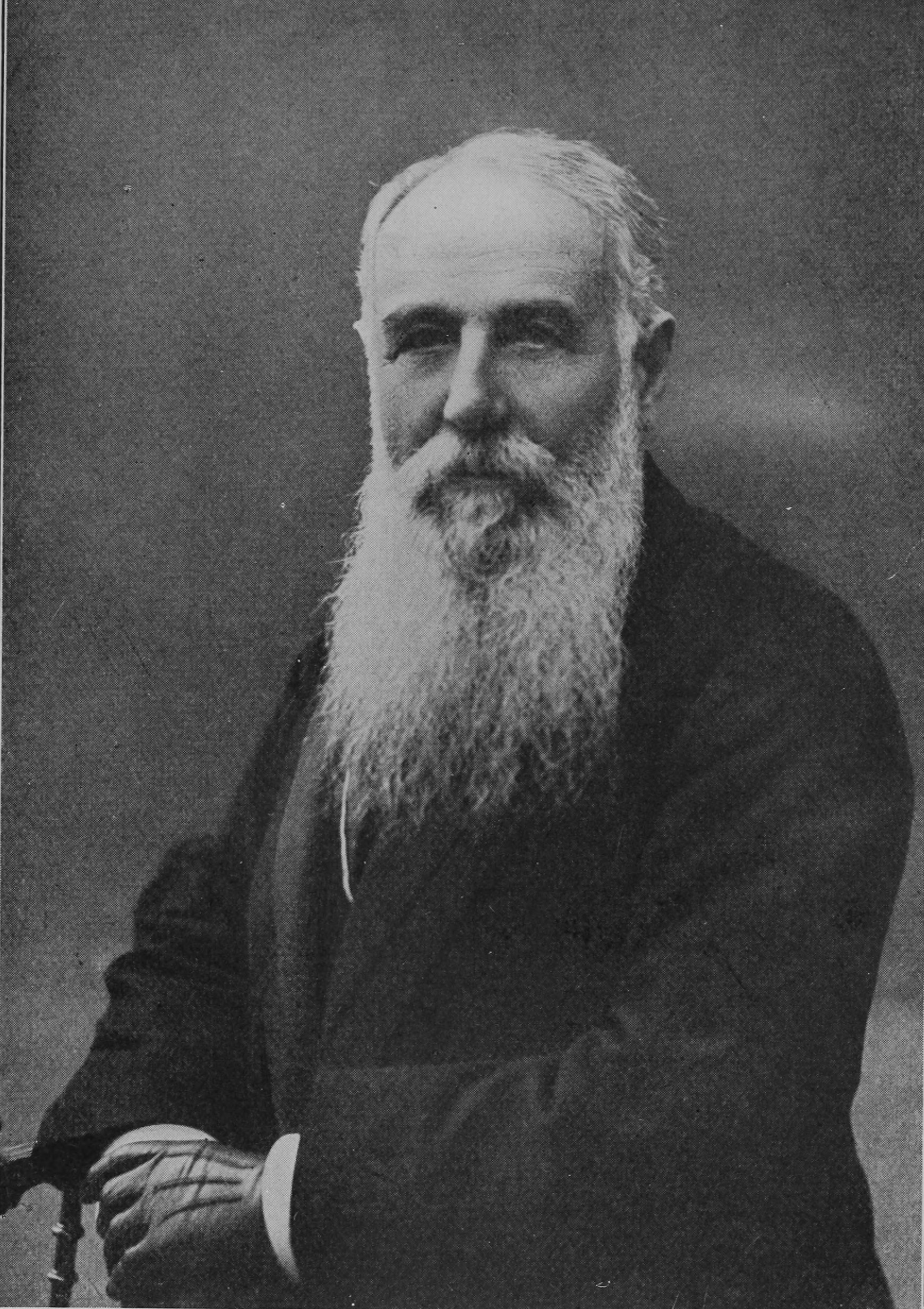
Nikola Pašić, Prime Minister of the Kingdom of Serbia in 1914.

In the hours following the assassination and with the support of information provided by the imperial and royal ambassador in Belgrade, officials of the Dual Monarchy directed their attention to the Serbian capital. The preliminary interrogations of suspects appeared to substantiate the Austro-Hungarian suspicions. On July 1, Danilo Ilić, a conspirator who was arrested during police raids on Bosnian-Herzegovinian Serbian nationalist circles, revealed the plot's extensive connections. However, establishing connections to the Kingdom of Serbia proved challenging, partly due to the behavior of prisoners implicated by Ilić.

This conclusion was further supported by the observations of Austro-Hungarian diplomats regarding the attitudes of the population within the kingdom. Despite the government in Belgrade's declaration of an official mourning period of eight weeks, which was subsequently reduced to eight days, the population expressed its vehement discontent, and the nationalist press launched attacks against Austria-Hungary. This occurred despite the appeals of Serbian diplomats stationed in other European countries and the disapproval of the Dual Monarchy. In response, the Serbian government invoked its constitution, which prohibited restrictions on press freedom, as justification for its inaction. Moreover, Austro-Hungarian diplomatic requests for an investigation into the connections of the conspiracy within Serbia yielded no tangible results, largely due to the lack of cooperation from Serbian investigators.

Furthermore, the electoral context in Serbia (Note: Elections were scheduled for August 14.) did not motivate the government to challenge the most radical nationalists. Nevertheless, as early as June 29, Prime Minister Nikola Pašić articulated in a public address that the Kingdom of Serbia would defend itself in the event of an Austro-Hungarian assault.

As outlined by Pašić, the Serbian response unfolded in three distinct phases. These phases reflect a cautious balancing act on the part of the government, which demonstrated a consistent willingness to cooperate with the Dual Monarchy's police throughout the crisis. The initial phase, spanning from June 28 to July 15, was characterized by a cautious and measured approach. The second phase commenced on July 15, following Hungary's decision to adopt a policy of retaliation against Serbia, which persisted until the issuance of the ultimatum. The third phase commenced with the ultimatum's delivery, influencing Serbia's response to the evolving crisis.

== A deliberate Austro-Hungarian response ==
As early as July 6, Austria-Hungary commenced preparations for its response to the assassination of the Habsburg heir apparent. This response was conveyed to the Serbian government in a note delivered on the afternoon of July 23. The drafting process involved consultations among key Austro-Hungarian actors, with particular attention paid to the timing of its delivery.

=== Planning the note ===
On July 8, Baron Musulin von Gomirje, a proficient Austro-Hungarian diplomat renowned for his literary proficiency and advocacy for crisis resolution through decisive action, was entrusted with the drafting process. The Vienna ministry exercised meticulous supervision over the drafting process, aiming for a text that Serbia might accept, except Point 6, which encroached upon Serbian sovereignty. (Note: At the time, the definition of sovereignty was based on Westphalian sovereignty.)

Upon completion on July 19, the draft was presented to Emperor Franz Joseph on July 20 and received his approval the following morning.

=== Structure of the ultimatum ===
The "July 23 Ultimatum" comprised three elements: a diplomatic note, a ten-point ultimatum, and a commentary on the circumstances and conditions of the document's delivery.

The introductory note delineated the grievances of the Dual Monarchy against Serbia, citing commitments Serbia had made in 1909 to maintain amicable relations with its neighbors. The Austro-Hungarian government explicitly accused Belgrade of tolerating the activities of the conspirators.

Subsequently, the ten-point ultimatum was presented. Three points demanded the cessation of anti-Austrian propaganda within Serbian territory, including the prohibition of nationalist press and Yugoslav propaganda. Four additional points called for the initiation of legal proceedings against those responsible for the assassination and the apprehension of any Serbian officials who may have been complicit in the plot. Points 5 and 6 underscored the importance of Serbian police collaboration with Austro-Hungarian authorities in identifying the perpetrators and demanded permission for Austro-Hungarian officials to operate within Serbian territory.

From the text, it becomes evident that Austro-Hungarian diplomats, at the behest of military leaders and key officials of the Dual Monarchy, sought to assert increasing control over their smaller neighbor. Their objective was to revert to the situation before 1903, effectively transforming the Kingdom of Serbia into a satellite of Austria-Hungary.

The note ended with a commentary intended for the Serbian government about the context in which the Austro-Hungarians had prepared the ultimatum.

=== Full Text ===
The following is the Austro-Hungarian note of July 23, 1914, translated by diplomat and writer Gabriel Hanotaux in his Histoire illustrée de la guerre de 1914, Volume 2:

==== Note ====
Serbia acknowledges that it has not been deprived of its rights by the fait accompli established in Bosnia-Herzegovina and that it will comply with whatever decisions the Powers make regarding Article XXV of the Treaty of Berlin. Following the advice of the Great Powers, Serbia pledges to abandon its protest and opposition regarding the annexation since last autumn and further undertakes to change its current policy toward Austria-Hungary to live henceforth on terms of good neighborliness with the latter.
However, the events of recent years, and particularly the tragic events of June 28, have demonstrated the existence in Serbia of a subversive movement whose aim is to detach certain parts of the Austro-Hungarian Monarchy. This movement, which has grown under the eyes of the Serbian government, has manifested beyond Serbian borders through acts of terrorism, a series of attacks, and murders.
The Royal Serbian Government, far from fulfilling the formal commitments contained in its declaration of March 31, 1909, has done nothing to suppress this movement. It has tolerated the criminal activities of various associations and affiliations directed against the Monarchy, the unrestrained rhetoric of the press, the glorification of attackers, the participation of officers and officials in subversive acts, unhealthy propaganda in public education, and finally, all manifestations likely to incite the Serbian population to hatred of the Monarchy and contempt for its institutions.
This culpable tolerance of the Royal Serbian Government persisted until the events of June 28 exposed to the world the disastrous consequences.
Testimonies and confessions from those responsible for the June 28 crime reveal that the Sarajevo assassination was plotted in Belgrade, that the weapons and explosives used were supplied by Serbian officers and officials associated with the "Narodna Odbrana," and that the crossing into Bosnia by the criminals and their arms was organized and carried out by Serbian border officials.
The results of the investigation compelled the Imperial and Royal Government to abandon the policy of patient forbearance it had observed for years regarding the activities concentrated in Belgrade and propagated from there onto the Monarchy's territory. On the contrary, these results impose the duty of putting an end to operations that pose a perpetual threat to the Monarchy's stability.
To achieve this objective, the Imperial and Royal Government finds itself obliged to request from the Serbian Government an official declaration condemning the propaganda directed against the Austro-Hungarian Monarchy—namely, all efforts ultimately aiming to detach parts of the Monarchy—and committing to suppress this criminal and terrorist propaganda by all available means.
To lend solemnity to this commitment, the Royal Serbian Government will publish the following statement on the front page of its Official Gazette on July 13/26:
The Royal Serbian Government condemns the propaganda directed against Austria-Hungary—namely, all movements ultimately aiming to detach territories belonging to the Austro-Hungarian Monarchy. It sincerely regrets the harmful consequences of these criminal acts.
The Royal Government regrets that Serbian officers and officials participated in the aforementioned propaganda, thereby compromising the good-neighborly relations to which the Royal Government had solemnly pledged itself in its declaration of March 31, 1909.
The Royal Government, which disapproves and repudiates all ideas or attempts to interfere in the affairs of the inhabitants of any part of Austria-Hungary, considers it its duty to formally warn officers, officials, and the population of the kingdom that, henceforth, it will act with the utmost severity against those guilty of such acts and will spare no effort to prevent and suppress them."
This statement will be simultaneously communicated to the Royal Army in an order of the day from His Majesty the King and published in the Army's Official Bulletin.

==== Ultimatum ====
Furthermore, the Royal Serbian Government pledges to:
1. Suppress any publication inciting hatred or contempt of the Monarchy and any works promoting actions against its territorial integrity.
2. Dissolve the "Narodna Odbrana" society and confiscate its propaganda tools, similarly addressing other organizations in Serbia involved in anti-monarchy activities, ensuring these groups cannot reconstitute themselves under a different name or form.
3. Remove from Serbian public education any content—whether in teaching staff or instructional materials—liable to incite propaganda against Austria-Hungary.
4. Dismiss from military and civil service all officers and officials guilty of anti-monarchy propaganda, with the names and offenses to be communicated by the Imperial and Royal Governments.
5. Permit Austro-Hungarian representatives to collaborate in Serbia in the suppression of the subversive movement targeting the Monarchy’s territorial integrity.
6. Initiate judicial proceedings against those implicated in the June 28 conspiracy within Serbian territory, with Austro-Hungarian delegates participating in the investigations.
7. Immediately arrest Commandant Vojislav Tankosić and Milan Ciganović, a Serbian state employee implicated by the Sarajevo investigation.
8. Prevent Serbian authorities from aiding the illegal trafficking of arms and explosives across the border and dismiss and severely punish officials at the Šabac and Loznica border posts who assisted the assassins of Sarajevo.
9. Provide explanations regarding hostile remarks made by Serbian officials, both domestically and abroad, who, despite their official status, expressed hostility toward the Monarchy in interviews following the June 28 attack.
10. Notify the Imperial and Royal Government without delay of the execution of these measures.
The Imperial and Royal Governments expect the Serbian Government's response by Saturday, July 25, at 5:00 pm.
A memorandum detailing the results of the Sarajevo investigation concerning officials mentioned in points 7 and 8 is attached to this note.

==== Commentary ====
The note concludes stating The Imperial and Royal Government invites Your Excellency to convey this note to the appropriate government, along with a detailed commentary:

On March 31, 1909, the Royal Serbian Government addressed Austria-Hungary with the declaration reproduced above.

Despite this declaration, Serbia pursued actions that directly undermined Austro-Hungarian stability:

Immediately after this declaration, Serbia embarked on a policy aimed at fostering subversive ideas among Austro-Hungarian subjects and preparing the separation of Austro-Hungarian territories bordering Serbia. Serbia thus became the hub of criminal agitation.

In the aftermath of the revolution, a wide range of organizations were established, overtly and covertly, to incite unrest within Austria-Hungary. These groups included influential figures from various sectors, such as "generals, diplomats, state officials, and judges," reflecting a cross-section of Serbian society.

The Serbian press played a pivotal role in promoting anti-Austrian sentiment:

Incitement to hatred and contempt for the neighboring monarchy, as well as calls for attacks on its security and integrity, were commonplace in Serbian press outlets.

Serbia also deployed agents to spread propaganda and influence the youth in Austro-Hungarian territories, while its politicians, some with violent histories in Macedonia, shifted their focus to supporting anti-Austrian terrorism:

The conspiratorial spirit of Serbian politicians—a trait that has left a bloody mark on the kingdom's history—has experienced a resurgence since the recent Balkan crisis.

Despite years of provocation, Austria-Hungary exercised restraint. However, Serbia failed to act against these activities, violating its commitments under the 1909 declaration:

The Serbian government has not taken any measures whatsoever. Consequently, the Serbian government failed in its duties as outlined in its solemn declaration of March 31, 1909, thereby contradicting the will of Europe and its commitments to Austria-Hungary.

Austria-Hungary had hoped that its lack of territorial ambitions and support for Serbia's expansion in 1912 would foster cooperation:

The Imperial and Royal Government's benevolent stance toward Serbia's political interests was predicated on the assumption that the kingdom would reciprocate with a similar approach.

However, Serbia continued to tolerate propaganda and actions against Austria-Hungary, leading to the assassination on June 28 of the heir presumptive to the Austro-Hungarian throne—a crime "orchestrated in Belgrade.”

Faced with this reality, Austria-Hungary felt compelled to act decisively to protect its security and territorial integrity:

The Imperial and Royal Government is confident that this action aligns with the sentiments of all civilized nations, which are opposed to the idea that regicide should become an unpunished weapon in political struggles.

To substantiate its claims, Austria-Hungary has shared a comprehensive dossier with the French government, detailing Serbia's role in the assassination. Copies of this communication have also been sent to other signatory powers:

You are duly authorized to leave a copy of this dispatch with the French Minister of Foreign Affairs.

=== Delivery of the ultimatum ===
The ultimatum was delivered on Thursday, July 23, at precisely 6 pm, when key French officials were expected to be aboard a ship returning from a visit to Russia. Consequently, the Austro-Hungarian ambassador delivered the note to the Serbian Minister of Finance, who was acting instead of the Prime Minister, at his location in Niš. The timing of this action effectively prevented the French and Russians from consulting with each other until the French delegation returned to Dunkirk, temporarily immobilizing two members of the Entente.

The timeframe for Serbia's response was also contingent upon the demands of the Austro-Hungarian military. Chief of General Staff Franz Conrad von Hötzendorf took into account the time required for Austro-Hungarian military mobilization and successfully requested that the response deadline be set for 5 p.m. on Saturday, allowing mobilization orders to be issued overnight.

The note delivered to the Serbian government included the text of the ultimatum and an appendix. The Austro-Hungarian ambassador presented the document to the Serbian minister, who objected to the short deadline, citing the ongoing Serbian electoral campaign. This objection was summarily dismissed.

From the moment the Austro-Hungarian note was delivered, the Serbian government was obliged to accept its terms within a period of 48 hours.

== International reactions ==
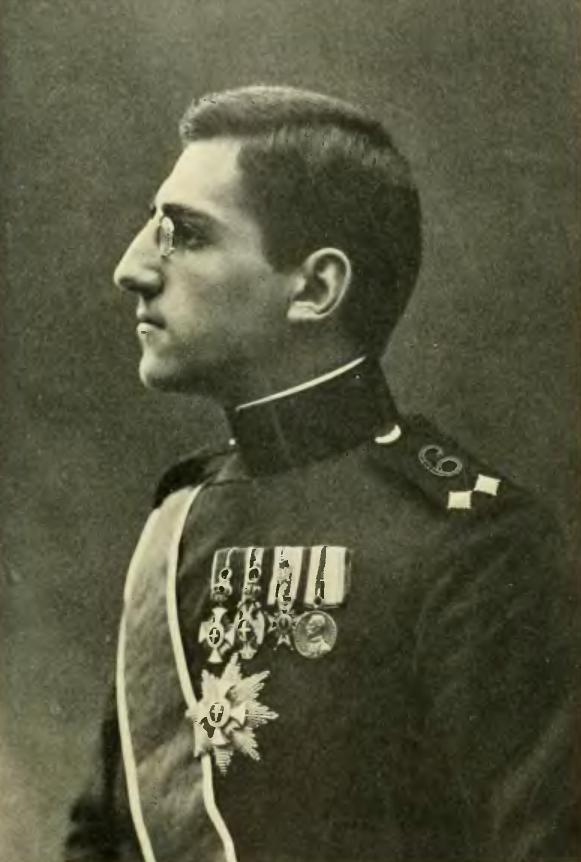
Regent Alexander orders the return of the kingdom's prime minister, Nikola Pašić, to Belgrade.

The response of the Serbian government was contingent upon the actions of Prime Minister Pašić on July 23 and the position adopted by Russia during the crisis. Initially unavailable due to his engagement in the electoral campaign and subsequent journey to Thessaloniki, the Prime Minister was directed by Regent Alexander to return to Belgrade without delay. In his absence, the Serbian cabinet convened to adopt measures to equip diplomats with arguments to defend the royal government's position. (Note: The cabinet decided to send a circular to all representatives of the kingdom abroad to justify its policies.)

However, Serbia's response came as no surprise, as the terms of the Austro-Hungarian note had been designed from the outset by the Ballhausplatz (Note: The Ballhausplatz, named after the square where it was located in Vienna, referred to the Austro-Hungarian Foreign Ministry.) designers to be unacceptable to the Belgrade government.

=== Partial text of the Serbian response of July 25, 1914 ===
The following is a partial translation of the Serbian response of July 25, 1914, as recorded by the diplomat and writer Gabriel Hanotaux in Histoire illustrée de la guerre de 1914 (Illustrated history of the 1914 war), Volume 2:

The Serbian government's response to Austro-Hungarian demands sought to address each point comprehensively, blending firm commitments with an adherence to constitutional principles. Serbia began by pledging to introduce legal reforms targeting anti-Austrian sentiments. Specifically, the government agreed:

to introduce, at the next regular session of the Skupština, a provision into the press law that would impose the severest penalties for inciting hatred and contempt against the Austro-Hungarian Monarchy, as well as for any publication whose general tendency is directed against the territorial integrity of Austria-Hungary.

Additionally, it committed to amending Article 22 of the Constitution to allow for the confiscation of such publications, a measure currently prohibited by constitutional constraints.

Regarding the dissolution of subversive organizations, Serbia remarked that it had no evidence of wrongdoing by these groups but nonetheless declared:

The Royal Government will comply with the Imperial and Royal Government's demand by dissolving the Narodna Odbrana Society and any other organizations acting against Austria-Hungary.

The Serbian government further committed to purging anti-Austrian materials from its public education system. However, it noted that:

The removal of such material would require the Imperial and Royal Government to supply facts and evidence of such propaganda.

On the matter of dismissing military personnel implicated in anti-Austro-Hungarian activities, Serbia promised compliance contingent on evidence from Vienna. It stated:

The Royal Government agrees to dismiss from military service anyone proven by judicial investigation to have engaged in acts against the territorial integrity of the Austro-Hungarian Monarchy. It awaits the Imperial and Royal Government's communication of the names and details of such officers and officials to initiate the appropriate proceedings.

Serbia expressed a willingness to collaborate with Austria-Hungary on investigations but noted its reservations about the scope of the demand. It acknowledged its duty to investigate individuals involved in the June 28 assassination plot and stated:

The Royal Government considers it its duty to initiate an investigation against all those involved, or potentially involved, in the June 28 plot and who are found on Serbian territory.

However, it resisted allowing foreign agents to participate in the process, citing constitutional and legal barriers.

Immediate actions were highlighted, including the arrest of Commander Vojislav Tankosić. Regarding Milan Ciganović, Serbia explained that he had not yet been located and requested Vienna to "provide evidence of guilt collected in the Sarajevo investigation to facilitate further inquiries.”

Additionally, Serbia committed to "reinforce and expand measures to prevent the illegal trafficking of arms and explosives across the border" and promised to investigate and punish any border officials who neglected their duties, enabling the perpetrators to cross into Austria-Hungary.

Addressing Austro-Hungary's concerns over hostile rhetoric, Serbia offered to provide clarifications for statements attributed to its officials, stating:

These explanations will be given as soon as the specific statements and evidence proving they were made are communicated.

Finally, Serbia emphasized its preference for a peaceful resolution of any outstanding issues, expressing readiness to refer the matter to international arbitration. It concluded:

Should the Imperial and Royal Government find this response unsatisfactory, the Royal Serbian Government... remains ready, as always, to seek a peaceful settlement by referring the matter to the Hague Tribunal or the Great Powers involved in the declaration of March 31, 1909.

Through its response, Serbia sought to balance addressing Austro-Hungarian grievances with safeguarding its sovereignty and legal integrity.

=== Serbian response: Partial compliance with Austro-Hungarian demands ===
Influences exerted by Russian Foreign Minister Sergey Sazonov resulted in the Serbian response addressing the majority of Austria-Hungary's demands, (Note: The Serbian government accepted eight of the ten conditions in the note.) particularly those that Belgrade could reasonably accept. Concurrently, the Serbian government sought clarification on the arguments presented by Vienna.

The Serbian response was written primarily by the Minister of Internal Affairs, Stojan Protić, with much input from the Cabinet. The response emphasized the change in diplomatic strategy towards Austria-Hungary after the resolution of the Bosnian Crisis. Its creators underscored the absence of involvement by the Serbian government in the assassination of Franz Ferdinand, expressed remorse over the involvement of Bosnian Serbs in the crime, and pledged action against Serbian nationals engaged in anti-Austrian propaganda.

Nevertheless, Serbia declined to permit Austrian law enforcement officials to operate within its borders. This decision was made following consultations with the Russian chargé d'affaires in Belgrade and subsequent explicit support from the Russian foreign minister. As a result of this refusal, diplomatic relations between the two countries were effectively terminated.

Serbia's apparent capitulation was rendered meaningless by the skillful wording of its response, which effectively rejected Austrian demands. This, however, deceived Kaiser Wilhelm II, who declared the day after Serbia's reply that "all grounds for war have disappeared."

The Serbian response was described by the Austrian note's author, Baron Musulin, as "the most brilliant exercise in diplomatic virtuosity". It prompted Austro-Hungarian ambassador Wladimir Giesl von Gieslingen to sever diplomatic ties with Serbia minutes after receiving the note.

=== The Austro-Serbian breakup ===
On the morning of Saturday, July 25, the Serbian cabinet convened to draft the government's response to the Austro-Hungarian note, which had been delivered the previous day and was set to expire that evening. That evening, shortly before 6 pm, Serbian Prime Minister Nikola Pašić (Note: No other member of the Serbian cabinet agreed to deliver the note to the Imperial and Royal ambassadors.) delivered the response to Wladimir Giesl, the Austro-Hungarian ambassador in Belgrade. Upon receiving the Serbian note, the ambassador promptly reviewed it and informed the Serbian Prime Minister of the severance of diplomatic relations between the Austro-Hungarian Empire and the Kingdom of Serbia.

In anticipation of the impending conflict, (Note: Austro-Hungarian interests in Serbia were taken over by the Reich, which remained officially neutral at this stage of the Austro-Serbian confrontation.) the Austro-Hungarian ambassador departed Belgrade at 6 pm. On July 28, Emperor Franz Joseph formally declared war on the Kingdom of Serbia on behalf of the Austro-Hungarian Empire.

=== European reactions: July 23–28 ===
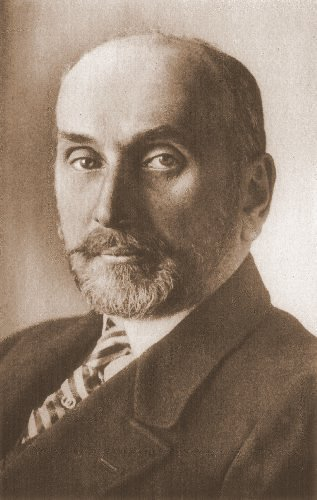
Sergei Dmitrievich Sazonov, Russian Foreign Minister.

Immediately following the distribution of the Austro-Hungarian note to Belgrade, European powers initiated discussions despite the constrained timeframe available to Serbia for coordinating with its allies. These consultations, coupled with the inflexible timeline established by the Central Powers, further reinforced French and Russian suspicions of Austro-German collusion in devising a response to the assassination of the Austro-Hungarian heir.

Russia was the first major power to offer a response. Despite an initially indignant reaction from Russian Foreign Minister Sergey Sazonov, the Russian Council of Ministers, soon joined by their French and British counterparts, proposed requesting an extension of the deadline for Serbia's reply. Concurrently, Russia initiated a partial mobilization of its armed forces, a decision that was publicly disclosed on July 28. In addition, economic countermeasures were implemented, including the repatriation of Russian assets from Germany and Austria-Hungary. These actions provoked the German Empire, whose diplomats were adamant in their assertion to their European counterparts that the Austro-Serbian conflict was a matter confined to the local and bilateral levels. Russia's response, though robust, was hindered by Austro-Hungarian diplomatic maneuvering. The timing of the note's delivery to Belgrade temporarily obstructed effective coordination between Russia and its French allies, as French leaders were en route back to France following a state visit to Russia. Nevertheless, French President Raymond Poincaré, a key figure in French diplomacy, conveyed that France would advise Russia to exercise moderation, on the condition that Germany exert similar restraint on its ally.

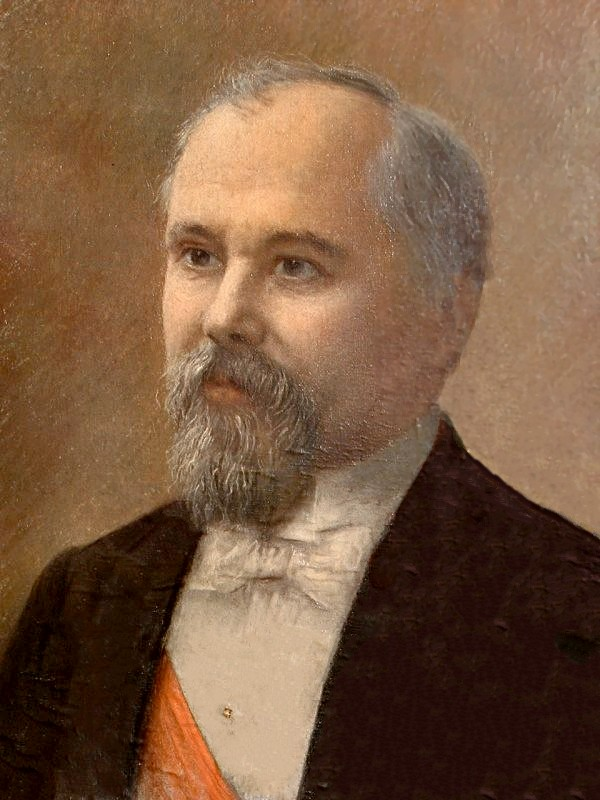
Raymond Poincaré by Pierre Carrier-Belleuse.

In the United Kingdom, the response was characterized by restraint and measured diplomacy. The British government put forth a proposal for mediation by the four major powers (Germany, Italy, France, and Britain) to facilitate conciliation between Serbia and Austria-Hungary following Belgrade's occupation by Austro-Hungarian forces. Prime Minister Edward Grey asserted that Britain should play an active role in addressing the crisis, particularly in the event of a renewed Balkan war involving Austria-Hungary directly. However, by July 27, the Austro-Hungarian leadership underestimated the extent of Russian support for Serbia and misinterpreted Britain's position.

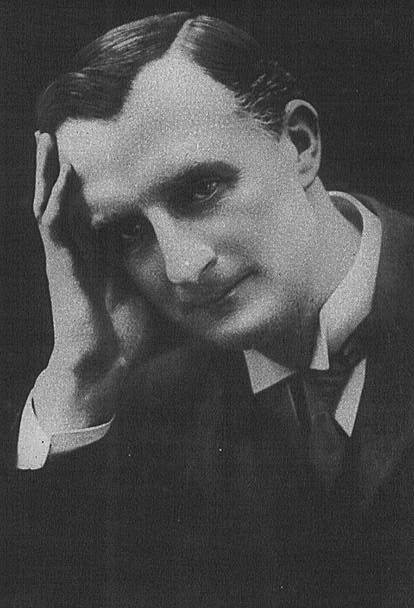
Edward Grey, UK Foreign Secretary from 1905 to 1916.

The responses from Russia and Britain were perceived as deceptive by Austro-Hungarian officials, who misjudged both the extent of Russian backing for Serbia and the implications of the British declaration.

Ultimately, the German government was made aware of the precise content of the Serbian note, albeit somewhat belatedly. The German government received a copy of the Serbian reply to the ultimatum at approximately midday on July 27. (Note: The Imperial Secretary of State for Foreign Affairs, Gottlieb von Jagow, had to insist that Vienna send the Serbian reply.) Subsequently, Gottlieb von Jagow, influenced by Wilhelm II's admiration for the quality of the Serbian reply, proposed that the Dual Monarchy restrict its military operations to a coup de main, with the objective of occupying Belgrade and defending this conquest. Additionally, the German Emperor advised the Dual Monarchy's military not to pursue Serbian troops following the occupation of Belgrade. (Note: Wilhelm II, Franz Joseph, and their advisors underestimated Serbia's potential for resistance, misjudging the quality of Serbian troops, who were battle-hardened from the Balkan Wars.) The Germans viewed the capture of the Serbian capital as a means of exerting influence over the course of peace negotiations between the Dual Monarchy and Serbia. German ministers endorsed this strategy, aiming to contain the crisis through diplomatic exchanges between Wilhelm II and Nicholas II.

== Declaration of war on Serbia: July 27–28 ==
On July 27, Austrian Foreign Minister Leopold Berchtold transmitted a missive to Emperor Franz Joseph containing erroneous information. This information suggested that the Serbian army had launched an offensive against Imperial forces, resulting in casualties. Berchtold leveraged this claim to justify the preparation of a war declaration telegram against Serbia, which he planned to transmit the following day unless the emperor objected. He expressed concern that the Triple Entente might broker a peaceful resolution if war were not declared immediately.

"Your Majesty,

I have the honor to submit to Your Majesty, attached herewith, a draft telegram addressed to the Serbian Ministry of Foreign Affairs containing a declaration of war against Serbia. I very humbly suggest that Your Majesty authorize me to dispatch this telegram tomorrow morning and to simultaneously arrange for the official publication of the war declaration in Vienna and Budapest.

Considering the Serbian government's response note, which was very cleverly drafted and handed over on March 28 by Mr. Pašić to the Imperial and Royal envoy, Baron Giesl, I find it lacking in substance though conciliatory in tone. I believe it is not impossible for the powers of the Triple Entente to still attempt a peaceful resolution of the conflict unless a decisive situation is created through the war declaration. According to a report from the 4th Army Corps Command, Serbian troops fired yesterday on our forces from boats on the Danube near Temes-Kubin, resulting in casualties.

The response to the gunfire led to a larger skirmish. Hostilities are thus effectively underway, making it all the more necessary to ensure that our army, from the perspective of international law, has the freedom of movement that only becomes available when a state of war is declared.

The notification of the state of war to neutral powers would be sent, with Your Majesty's supreme approval, concurrently with the declaration to their local representatives. I must note that His Imperial and Royal Highness, Archduke Friedrich, Commander-in-Chief of the Balkan Armed Forces, as well as the Chief of the General Staff, have opposed the issuance of the war declaration. Nonetheless, we have decided not to oppose the declaration being made tomorrow morning. With the utmost reverence,

Vienna, July 27, 1914. [Signed] Berchtold."

The text of the telegram and the dispatches sent to embassies on July 28, 1914, is as follows:

"The Royal Government of Serbia, not having responded satisfactorily to the note that was delivered to it by the Minister of Austria-Hungary in Belgrade on July 23, 1914, the Imperial and Royal Government finds itself compelled to ensure the safeguarding of its rights and interests by its means and to resort to the force of arms for this purpose, particularly since Serbian troops have already attacked an Imperial and Royal Army detachment near Temes-Kubin. Austria-Hungary therefore considers itself, from this moment, to be in a state of war with Serbia.

The Minister of Foreign Affairs of Austria-Hungary. [Signed] Count Berchtold."

The purported assault at Temes-Kubin by the Serbian military, which was presented as a rationale for initiating hostilities and securing the Emperor's approval, was ultimately revealed to be a mere Austro-Hungarian operation aimed at capturing two Serbian steamboats. This operation resulted in no deaths or injuries. This event was no longer mentioned in the text published in the official gazette on July 28, 1914, at 4:25 am, which was subsequently picked up by press agencies.

"Vienna, July 28.

The Austro-Hungarian government has officially notified Serbia of the declaration of war.

The Official Gazette, in a special edition, publishes the text of the declaration as follows:

The Royal Government of Serbia, not having responded satisfactorily to the note that was delivered to it by the Minister of Austria-Hungary in Belgrade on July 23, 1914, the Imperial and Royal Government finds itself compelled to ensure the safeguarding of its rights and interests by its means and to resort to the force of arms for this purpose.

Austria-Hungary therefore considers itself, from this moment, to be in a state of war with Serbia.

The Minister of Foreign Affairs of Austria-Hungary. [Signed] Count Berchtold."

== See also ==
- Black Hand (Serbia)
- Assassination of Archduke Franz Ferdinand
- July Crisis
- Causes of World War I
- Austria-Hungary
- Kingdom of Serbia
- History of Austria-Hungary during World War I
- Franz Joseph I of Austria
- Peter I of Serbia
- Wilhelm II
- Leopold Berchtold
- Stephan Burián von Rajecz
- Franz Conrad von Hötzendorf
- István Tisza
- Nikola Pašić
- Ultimatum of 18 October 1913

== Notes ==
Sources

== Bibliography ==
- Bled, Jean-Paul (2014). L'Agonie d'une monarchie : Autriche-Hongrie 1914–1920 [The Agony of a Monarchy: Austria-Hungary 1914-1920] (in French). Paris: Taillandier. ISBN 979-10-210-0440-5.
- Beer, Siegfried (2008). "Les services du renseignement habsbourgeois ont-ils échoué ? La défaite des services du renseignement austro-hongrois dans la Première Guerre mondiale" [Did the Habsburg intelligence services fail? The defeat of Austro-Hungarian intelligence in the First World War]. Guerres Mondiales et Conflits Contemporains (in French). 4 (232): 73–85. doi:10.3917/gmcc.232.0073. Archived from the original on April 3, 2024.
- Clark, Christopher (2013). Les Somnambules : Été 1914 : comment l'Europe a marché vers la guerre [Les Somnambules: Summer 1914: how Europe marched to war] (in French). Paris: Flammarion. ISBN 978-2-08-121648-8.
- Cochet, François; Porte, Rémy (2008). Dictionnaire de la grande guerre : 1914-1918 [Dictionary of the Great War: 1914-1918] (in French). Paris: Robert Laffont. ISBN 978-2-221-10722-5.
- Fischer, Fritz (1970). Griff nach der Weltmacht [Germany's Aims in the First World War]. Paris: Éditions de Trévise.
- Hanotaux, Gabriel (1924). Histoire illustrée de la guerre de 1914 [Illustrated history of the 1914 war]. Vol. 2. Paris: Gounouilhou.
- Krumeich, Gerd (2014). Le Feu aux poudres : Qui a déclenché la guerre en 1914 ? [Le Feu aux poudres: Who started the war in 1914?]. Histoire (in French). Paris: Belin. ISBN 978-2-7011-9090-7.
- Lacroix-Riz, Annie (1996). Le Vatican, l'Europe et le Reich : De la Première Guerre mondiale à la guerre froide [The Vatican, Europe and the Reich: From the First World War to the Cold War]. Références Histoire. Paris: Armand Colin. ISBN 2-200-21641-6.
- Le Moal, Frédéric (2008). La Serbie du martyre à la victoire. 1914-1918 [Serbia from martyrdom to victory. 1914-1918]. Les Nations dans la Grande Guerre (in French). Paris: Éditions SOTECA. ISBN 978-2-916385-18-1.
- Renouvin, Pierre (1934). La Crise européenne et la Première Guerre mondiale [The European crisis and the First World War]. Peuples et civilisations (in French). Paris: Presses Universitaires de France.
- Roth, François (2014). Six mois qui incendièrent le monde : Juillet-décembre 1914 [Six months that set the world on fire: July-December 1914] (in French). Paris: Tallandier. ISBN 979-10-210-0378-1.
- Schiavon, Max (2011). L'Autriche-Hongrie dans la Première Guerre mondiale : La fin d'un empire [Austria-Hungary in the First World War: The end of an empire]. Les Nations dans la Grande Guerre (in French). Paris: Éditions SOTECA. ISBN 978-2-916385-59-4.
- Seiti, Arta (2015). Des guerres balkaniques à la Grande Guerre : un regard stratégique [From the Balkan Wars to the Great War: a strategic perspective] (in French). Paris: Les Cahiers de la Revue Défense Nationale. ISSN 2105-7508.
