= Skripov =

Skripov may refer to places in the Czech Republic:

- Skřipov, a municipality and village in the Moravian-Silesian Region
- Skřípov, a municipality and village in the Olomouc Region
