= Ethnic and religious composition of Austria-Hungary =

The ethno-linguistic composition of Austria-Hungary according to the census of 31 December 1910 was as follows:

== Population ==
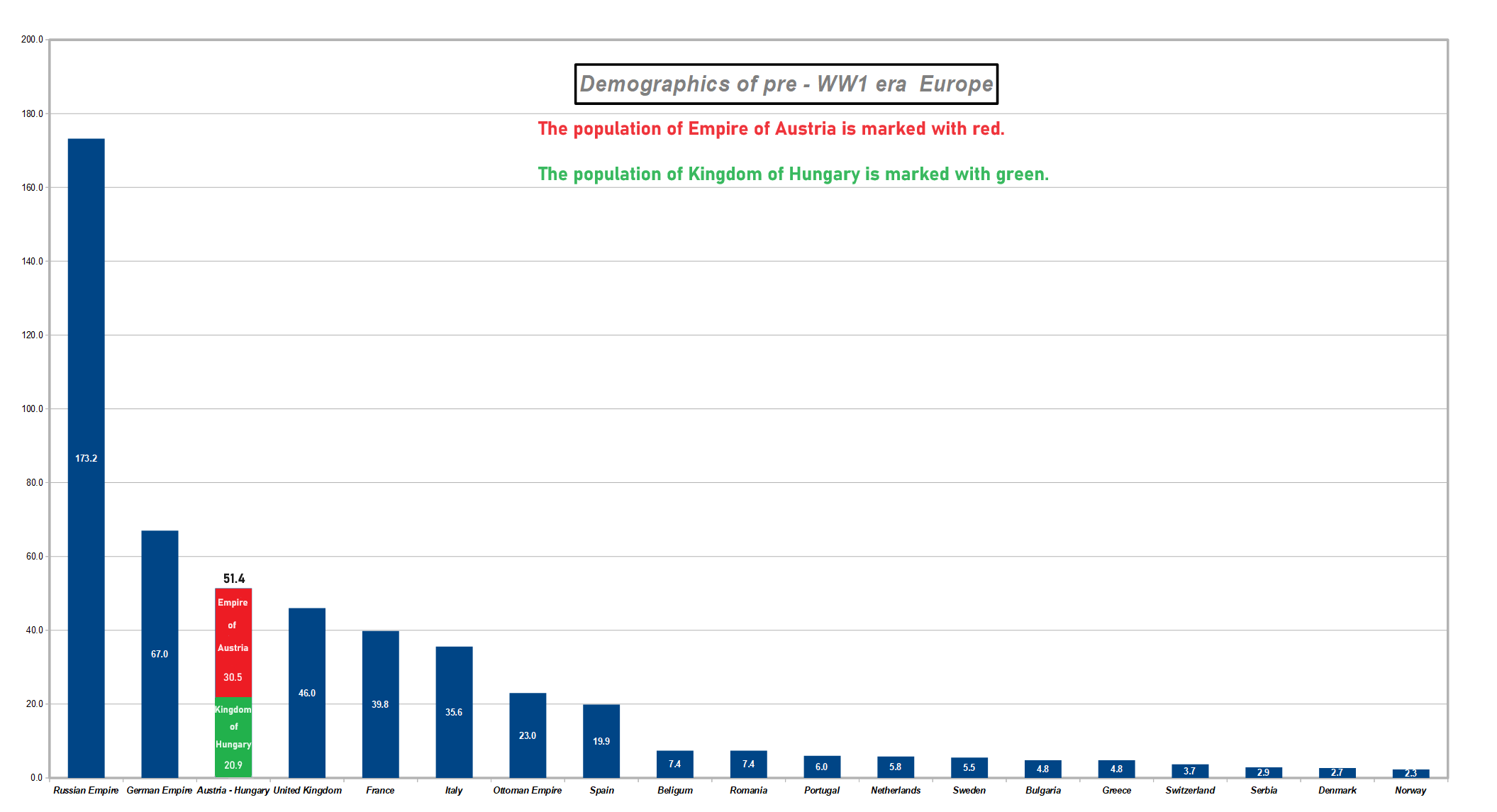
Demographics of pre-WW1 Austria (red) and Hungary (green) in Europe

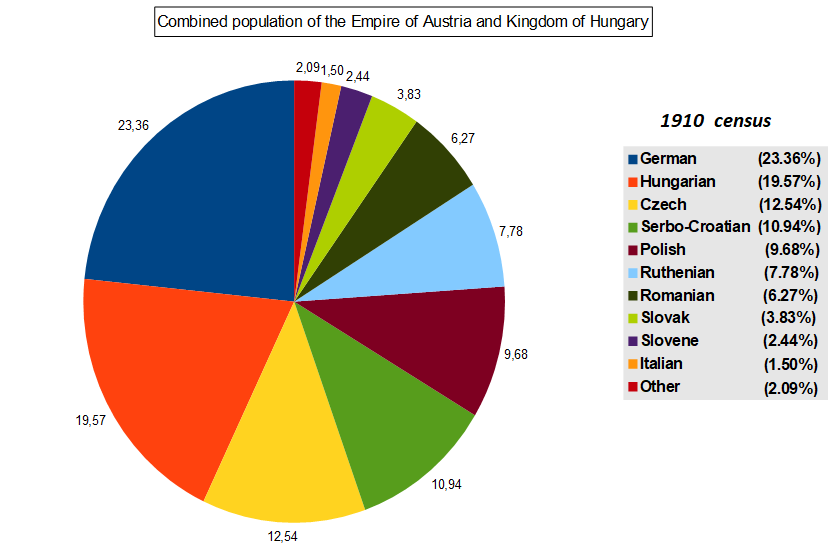
Combined demographics of the Empire of Austria and Kingdom of Hungary (1910).

| Area | Number | % |
|---|---|---|
| Cisleithania(Austrian Empire) | 28,571,934 | 55.6 |
| Transleithania(Kingdom of Hungary) | 20,886,487 | 40.6 |
| Bosnia and Herzegovina (Austro-Hungarian condominium) | 1,931,802 | 3.8 |
| Total | 51,390,223 | 100.0 |

=== Largest cities ===
Data: census in 1910

Austrian Empire
| Rank | Current English name | Contemporary official name | Other | Present-day country | Population in 1910 | Present-day population |
|---|---|---|---|---|---|---|
| 1. | Vienna | Wien | Bécs, Beč, Dunaj | Austria | 2,031,498 (city without the suburb 1,481,970) | 1,840,573 (Metro: 2,600,000) |
| 2. | Prague | Prag, Praha | Prága | Czech Republic | 668,000 (city without the suburb 223,741) | 1,301,132 (Metro: 2,620,000) |
| 3. | Trieste | Triest | Trieszt, Trst | Italy | 229,510 | 204,420 |
| 4. | Lviv | Lemberg, Lwów | Ilyvó, Львів, Lvov, Львов | Ukraine | 206,113 | 728,545 |
| 5. | Cracow | Krakau, Kraków | Krakkó, Krakov | Poland | 151,886 | 762,508 |
| 6. | Graz | | Grác, Gradec | Austria | 151,781 | 328,276 |
| 7. | Brno | Brünn, Brno | Berén, Börön, Börénvásár | Czech Republic | 125,737 | 377,028 |
| 8. | Chernivtsi | Czernowitz | Csernyivci, Cernăuți, Чернівці | Ukraine | 87,128 | 242,300 |
| 9. | Plzeň | Pilsen, Plzeň | Pilzen | Czech Republic | 80,343 | 169,858 |
| 10. | Linz | | Linec | Austria | 67,817 | 200,841 |

Kingdom of Hungary
| Rank | Current English name | Contemporary official name | Other | Present-day country | Population in 1910 | Present-day population |
|---|---|---|---|---|---|---|
| 1. | Budapest | | Budimpešta | Hungary | 1,232,026 (city without the suburb 880,371) | 1,735,711 (Metro: 3,303,786) |
| 2. | Szeged | | Szegedin, Segedin | Hungary | 118,328 | 170,285 |
| 3. | Subotica | Szabadka | Суботица | Serbia | 94,610 | 105,681 |
| 4. | Debrecen | | | Hungary | 92,729 | 208,016 |
| 5. | Zagreb | | Zágráb, Agram | Croatia | 79,038 | 803,000 (Metro: 1,228,941) |
| 6. | Bratislava | Pozsony | Pressburg, Prešporok | Slovakia | 78,223 | 425,167 |
| 7. | Timișoara | Temesvár | Temeswar | Romania | 72,555 | 319,279 |
| 8. | Kecskemét | | | Hungary | 66,834 | 111,411 |
| 9. | Oradea | Nagyvárad | Großwardein | Romania | 64,169 | 196,367 |
| 10. | Arad | Arad | | Romania | 63,166 | 159,074 |
| 11. | Hódmezővásárhely | | | Hungary | 62,445 | 46,047 |
| 12. | Cluj-Napoca | Kolozsvár | Klausenburg | Romania | 60,808 | 324,576 |
| 13. | Újpest | | | Hungary | 55,197 | 100,694 |
| 14. | Miskolc | | | Hungary | 51,459 | 157,177 |
| 15. | Pécs | | | Hungary | 49,852 | 145,347 |

== Languages ==
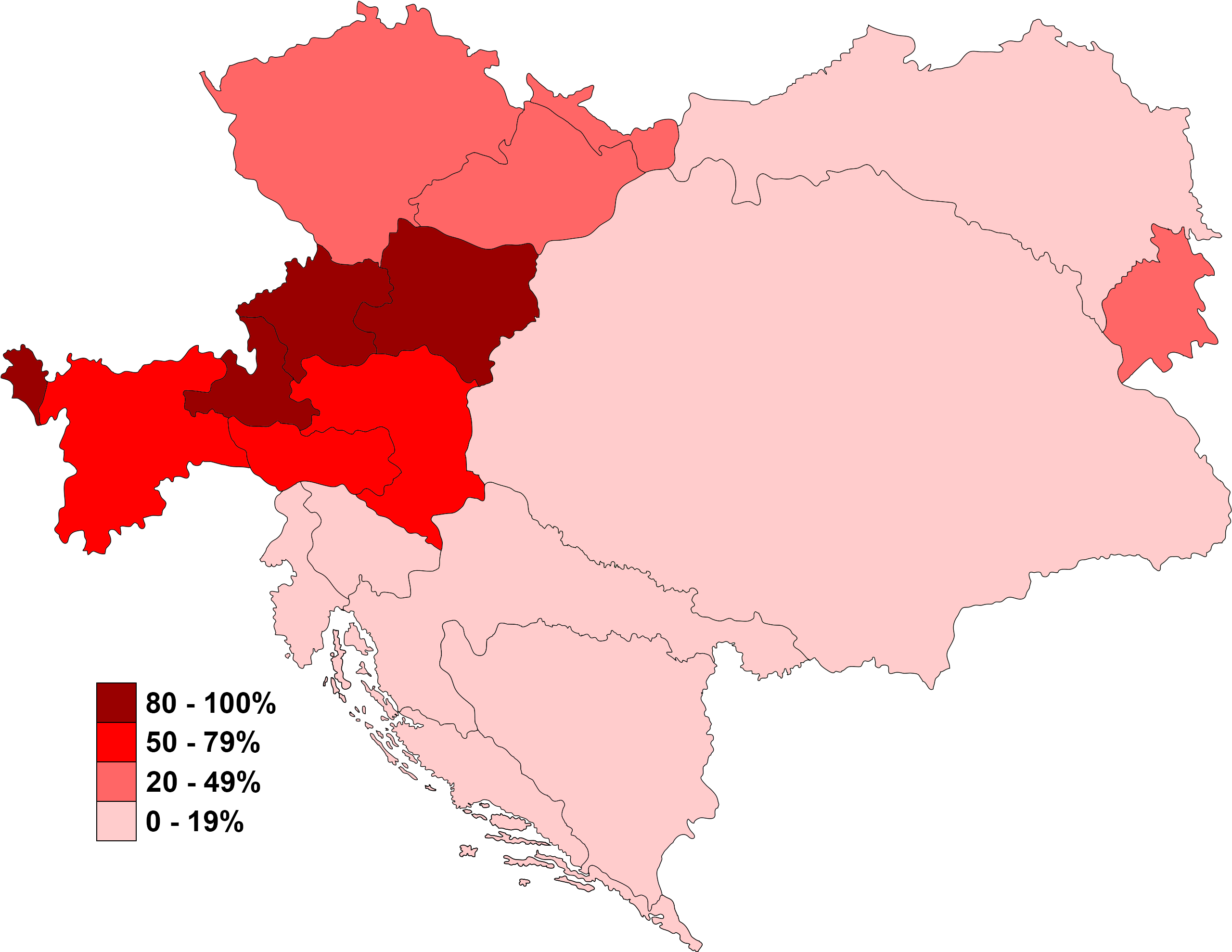
Distribution of the German language in Austria-Hungary in 1910

Ethno-linguistic map of Austria-Hungary, 1910. (Rusyns are registered as Ukrainians)

In the Austrian Empire (Cisleithania), the census of 1911 recorded Umgangssprache, everyday language. Jews and those using German in offices often stated German as their Umgangssprache, even when having a different Muttersprache. The Istro-Romanians were counted as Romanians.

In the Kingdom of Hungary (Transleithania), the 1910 census was based on mother tongue. According to the census, 54.4% of the inhabitants of Hungary were recorded to speak Hungarian as their native language. This number included the Jewish ethnic group (around 5% of the population) who were overwhelmingly Hungarian-speaking (the Jews tending to declare German as mother tongue due to the immigration of Jews of Yiddish/German mother tongue).

| Language | Number | % |
|---|---|---|
| German | 12,006,521 | 23.36 |
| Hungarian | 10,056,315 | 19.57 |
| Czech | 6,442,133 | 12.54 |
| Serbo-Croatian | 5,621,797 | 10.94 |
| Polish | 4,976,804 | 9.68 |
| Ruthenian | 3,997,831 | 7.78 |
| Romanian | 3,224,147 | 6.27 |
| Slovak | 1,967,970 | 3.83 |
| Slovene | 1,255,620 | 2.44 |
| Italian | 768,422 | 1.50 |
| Other | 1,072,663 | 2.09 |
| Total | 51,390,223 | 100.00 |

=== Cisleithanian states (Austrian Empire) ===
| Land | Main language | Others (if more than 2%) |
|---|---|---|
| Bohemia | Czech (63.2%) | German (36.8%) |
| Dalmatia | Serbo-Croatian (94.6%) | Italian (2.8%) |
| Galicia | Polish (58.6%) | Ruthenian (40.2%) |
| Lower Austria | German (95.9%) | Czech (3.8%) |
| Upper Austria | German (99.7%) | |
| Bukovina | Ruthenian (38.4%) | Romanian (34.4%), German (21.2%), Polish (4.6%) |
| Carinthia | German (78.6%) | Slovenian (20.7%) |
| Carniola | Slovenian (94.4%) | German (4.9%) |
| Salzburg | German (99.7%) | |
| Austrian Silesia | German (43.9%) | Polish (31.7%), Czech (24.3%) |
| Styria | German (70.5%) | Slovenian (28.4%) |
| Moravia | Czech (71.8%) | German (27.6%) |
| County of Tyrol | German (57.3%) | Italian (42.1%) |
| Austrian Littoral | Italian (39.6%) | Slovenian (29.5%), Serbo-Croatian (18.8%), German (3.1%) |
| Vorarlberg | German (95.4%) | Italian (4.4%) |

=== Transleithanian lands (Kingdom of Hungary) ===
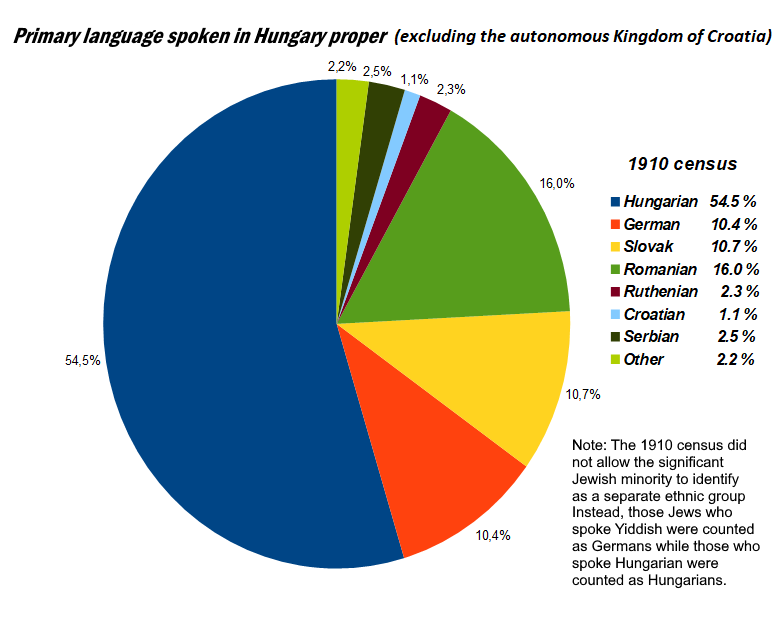
In the Kingdom of Hungary, the 1910 census was based on mother tongue.

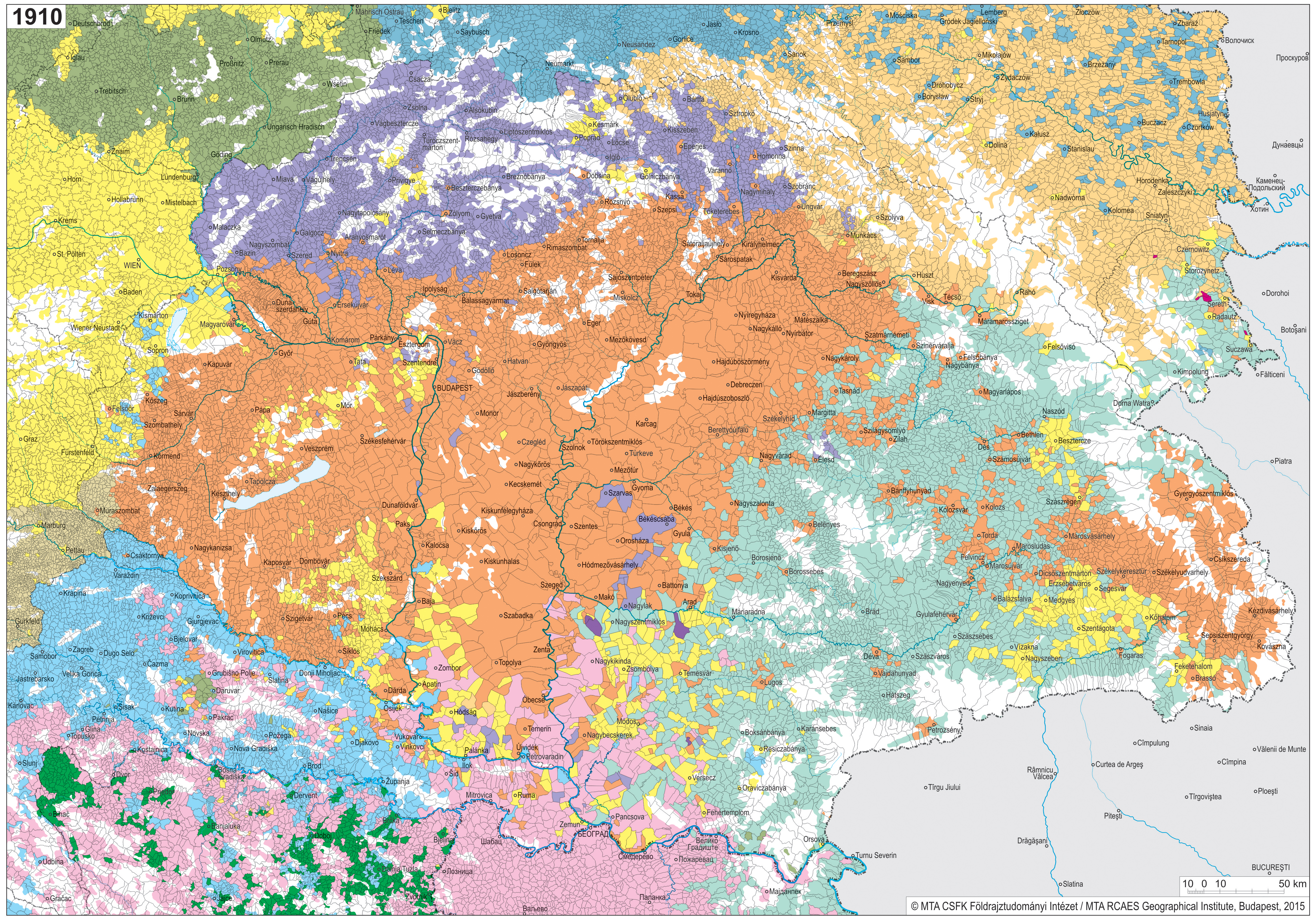
Ethnic map of the Kingdom of Hungary in 1910, based on the 1910 Hungarian census.

| Land | Mother tongues (1910 census) |
|---|---|
| Kingdom of Hungary | Hungarian (54.4%), Romanian (16.1%), Slovak (10.7%), German (10.4%), Ruthenian (2.5%), Serbian (2.5%), Croatian (1.8%) |
| Kingdom of Croatia-Slavonia | Croatian (62.5%), Serbian (24.6%), German (5.0%), Hungarian (4.1%) |

| Land | Hungarian | Romanian | German | Slovak | Croatian | Serbian | Ruthenian | Other | Total |
|---|---|---|---|---|---|---|---|---|---|
| Danube Right Bank | 72% (2,221,295) | 0% (833) | 18% (555,694) | 0.6% (17,188) | 5.5% (168,436) | 0.5% (15,170) | 0% (232) | 3.4% (105,556) | 14.8% (3,084,404) |
| Danube Left Bank | 32.7% (711,654) | 0% (704) | 6.6% (144,395) | 58.8% (1,279,574) | 0.1% (2,294) | 0% (200) | 0% (393) | 1.7% (36,710) | 10.4% (2,175,924) |
| Danube-Tisza | 81.2% (3,061,066) | 0.1% (4,813) | 9.5% (357,822) | 2.1% (79,354) | 0.1% (4,866) | 4.1% (154,298) | 0.3% (11,121) | 4.1% (96,318) | 18% (3,769,658) |
| Tisza Right Bank | 53.5% (945,990) | 0.1% (1,910) | 5.6% (98,564) | 25% (441,776) | 0% (486) | 0% (247) | 14.3% (253,062) | 1.6% (27,646) | 8.5% (1,769,681) |
| Tisza Left Bank | 61.8% (1,603,924) | 24% (621,918) | 3.2% (83,229) | 3.1% (81,154) | 0% (327) | 0% (321) | 7.5% (194,504) | 0.3% (8,547) | 12.4% (2,594,924) |
| Tisza-Maros | 22.2% (474,988) | 39.5% (845,850) | 19.9% (427,253) | 2.1% (44,715) | 0.2% (4,950) | 13.6% (290,434) | 0.1% (3,188) | 2.4% (50,391) | 10.3% (2,141,769) |
| Transylvania | 34.3% (918,217) | 55% (1,472,021) | 8.7% (234,085) | 0.1% (2,404) | 0% (523) | 0% (421) | 0.1% (1,759) | 1.8% (48,937) | 12.8% (2,678,367) |
| Fiume | 13% (6,493) | 0.3% (137) | 4.6% (2,315) | 0.4% (192) | 26% (12,926) | 0.9% (425) | 0% (11) | 54.8 (27,307, mostly Italian) | 0.2% (49,806) |
| Croatia-Slavonia | 4% (105,948) | 0% (846) | 5.1% (134,078) | 0.8% (21,613) | 62.5% (1,638,354) | 24.6% (644,955) | 0.3% (8,317) | 2.6% (67,843) | 12.6% (2,621,954) |
| Total | 48.1% (10,050,575) | 14.1% (2,949,032) | 9.8% (2,037,435) | 9.4% (1,967,970) | 8.8% (1,833,162) | 5.3% (1,106,471) | 2.3% (472,587) | 2.2% (469,255) | 100% (20,886,487) |

==== Historical regions ====
| Region | Mother Tongues | Hungarian language | Other languages |
|---|---|---|---|
| Transylvania | Romanian – 2,819,467 (54%) | 1,658,045 (31.7%) | German – 550,964 (10.5%) |
| Upper Hungary | Slovak – 1,688,413 (57.9%) | 881,320 (30.2%) | German – 198,405 (6.8%) |
| Délvidék | Serbo-Croatian – 601,770 (39.8%) | 425,672 (28.1%) | German – 324,017 (21.4%); Romanian – 75,318 (5.0%); Slovak – 56,690 (3.7%) |
| Transcarpathia | Ruthenian – 330,010 (54.5%) | 185,433 (30.6%) | German – 64,257 (10.6%) |
| Fiume | Italian – 24,212 (48.6%) | 6,493 (13%) | Serbo-Croatian – 13,351 (26.8%); Slovene - 2,336 (4.7%); German - 2,315 (4.6%) |
| Őrvidék | German – 217,072 (74.4%) | 26,225 (9%) | Croatian – 43,633 (15%) |
| Muravidék | Slovene – 74,199 (80.4%) – in 1921 | 14,065 (15.2%) – in 1921 | German – 2,540 (2.8%) – in 1921 |

The Germans in Croatia were mainly living in the eastern parts of the country where they had been settled along the Drava and Danube rivers, and the former Military Frontier (Militärgrenze), after the Habsburg (re)conquest of the area from the Ottomans in 1687.

== Religions ==
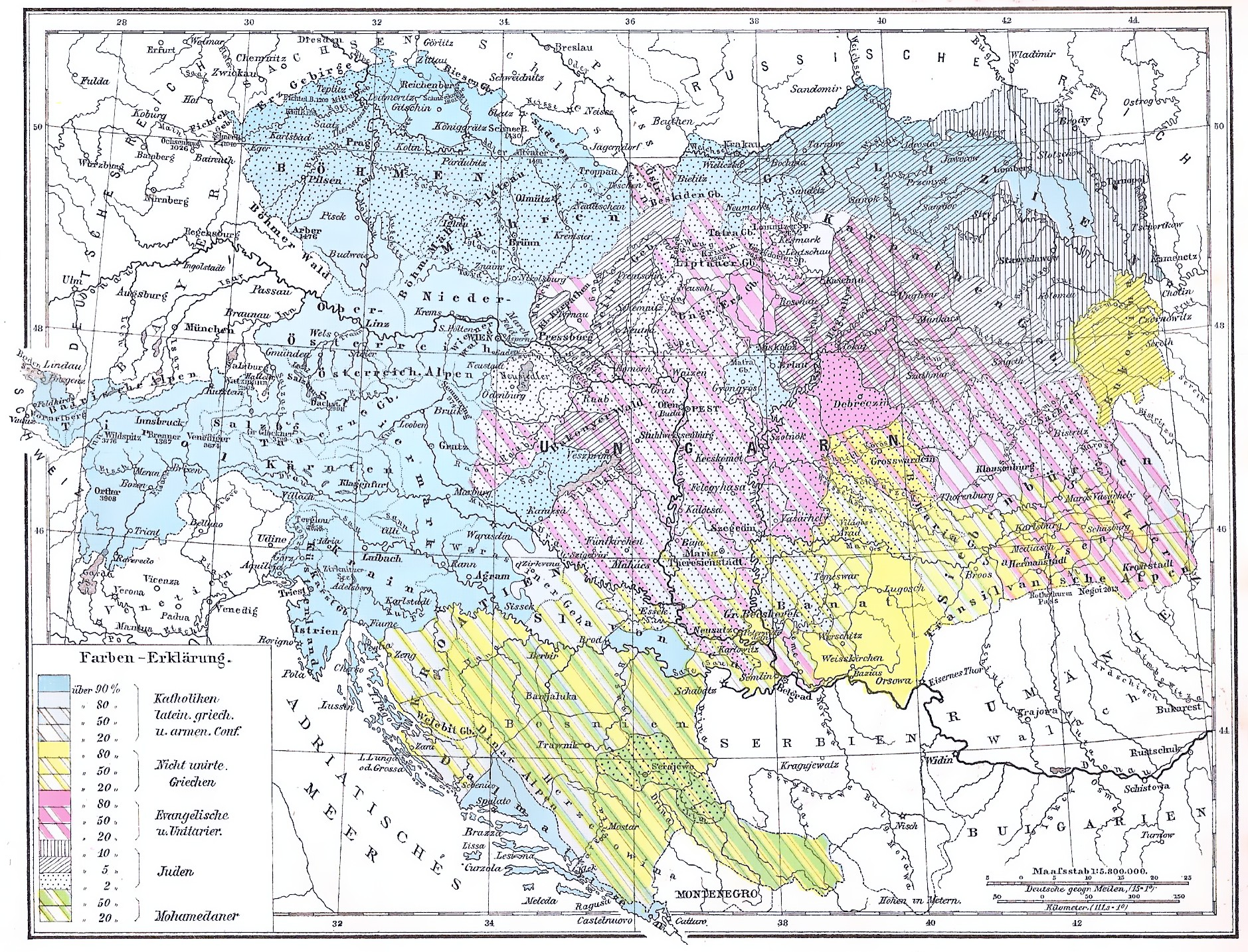
Map of religions, from Andrees Allgemeiner Handatlas

| Religions/Confessions | in all of Austria-Hungary | Austrian part | Hungarian part | Bosnia and Herzegovina |
|---|---|---|---|---|
| Catholics | 76.6% | 90.9% | 61.8% | 22.9% |
| Protestants | 8.9% | 2.1% | 19% | 0.3% |
| Orthodox | 8.7% | 2.3% | 14.3% | 43.5% |
| Jews | 4.4% | 4.7% | 4.9% | 0.6% |
| Muslims | 1.3% | 0% | 0% | 32.7% |

== Subgroups ==
The ethnic groups of the Austro-Hungarian empire subdivided according to their own sub-ethnic groups and regions they inhabited:

=== Germans ===
The ethnic germans of the Austro-Hungarian empire spoked a variety of dialects, which the following were spoken in the empire:

- Central Bavarian (Austro-Bavarian) - in Lower and Upper Austria, Styria, Hungary, Northern Carinthia, Moravia, Salzburg, Bohemia, Carniola (mostly in Gottschee), Galicia, Transylvania (by the Landlers), Trieste, Bukovina, Voivodina and Banat, Croatia-Slavonia and Gorizia.
- Southern Bavarian - in North and South Tyrol, Mochèni and Luserna.
- Alemmanic - in Banat, Hungary, Vorarlberg, Galicia and Transylvania.
- Franconian - Northwestern Bohemia, Hungary, Galicia (from the Rhenish Palatinate), Voivodina and Banat, and Bukovina.
- Upper Saxon - in the Erzgebirge in Bohemia, Hungary, Bukovina and Galicia (colonists from Bohemia).
- Sudeten (Silesian) - Bohemia in the Giant Mountains, Moravia in Schönhengstgau and Kuhland, Silesia, Hungary and Galicia in the frontier with Silesia and the Carpathians.
- Low German (Central Franconian) - by the Transylvanian Saxons, Zipser Saxons and in Galicia.

=== Czechs ===
The Czechs inhabited the three traditional Czech lands of Bohemia (Čechy), Moravia (Morava) and Silesia (Slezsko), which had their own traditional ethnographical Czech groups (Moravians, Silesians). Further sub-ethnic groups of the Moravians included the Horáci, the Hanáki and the Moravian Wallachians.

Lower Austria was home to a significant Czech population; especially in the capital, Vienna. There was also significant Czech settlements in Galicia and Slavonia (Czechs in Croatia).

=== Slovaks ===
The inhabitants of the Moravian Slovakia region (in current-day Czechia) were considered in the 19th century as linguistically, speakers of the Czech language, but ethnically belonging to the Slovak ethnicity.

There were Slovak diaspora communnities in Austria, Hungary proper, Voivodina, Slavonia, Banat and Crișana.

=== Poles ===
Subgroups of the Polish population:

- Silesians (Lachs, Vlachs)
- Gorals
- Bukovina Poles

=== Ukrainians ===
Ethnographical groups associated or considered part of the Ukrainian ethnic group in the 19th century included:

- Boykos
- Hutsuls
- Rusyns
  - Pannonian Rusyns
- Lemkos
- Lyshaks (living in Maramures and Ugocsa)

== See also ==
- Demographics of the Kingdom of Hungary by county
- Minority Treaties
- Treaty of Saint-Germain-en-Laye (1919)
- Treaty of Trianon (1920)

== Sources ==
- Taylor, A.J.P. (1948). The Habsburg Monarchy 1809–1918 – A History of the Austrian Empire and Austria-Hungary. London: Hamish Hamilton.
