= Ultimatum of 18 October 1913 =

Diplomatic note from Austria-Hungary to Serbia in 1913

The ultimatum of October 18, 1913 was a diplomatic note addressed by Austria-Hungary to Serbia. Drafted by Count Leopold Berchtold, then the common minister of foreign affairs of the dual monarchy, this ultimatum demanded that the kingdom of Belgrade evacuate the Serbian troops deployed since the beginning of 1913 on Albanian territory. The Austro-Hungarian request came at a time when the Serbian Prime Minister, Nikola Pašić, repeatedly gave dilatory or evasive responses on behalf of his country to Austro-Hungarian demands for the evacuation of the territories concerned. It quickly became apparent to Serbian officials that Russian support was not assured and that the rules of international law placed Serbia in a position of infraction, as Serbia's occupation of part of Albanian territory was condemned, just like the unilateral occupation of an independent territory: in this situation, the small Serbian kingdom, abandoned by its foreign supporters, Russia and France, was forced to comply with Austro-Hungarian demands.

== Context ==
=== Balkan Wars ===
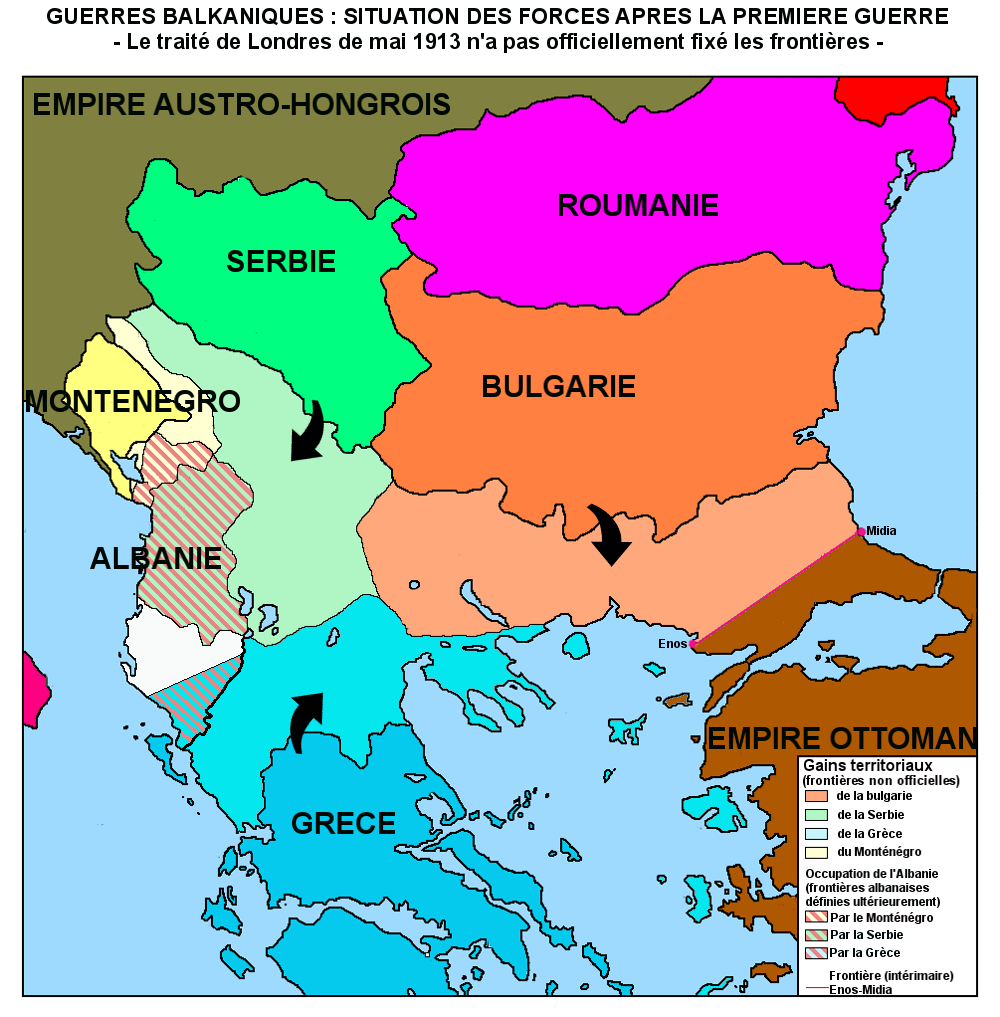
The Balkans after the First Balkan War.

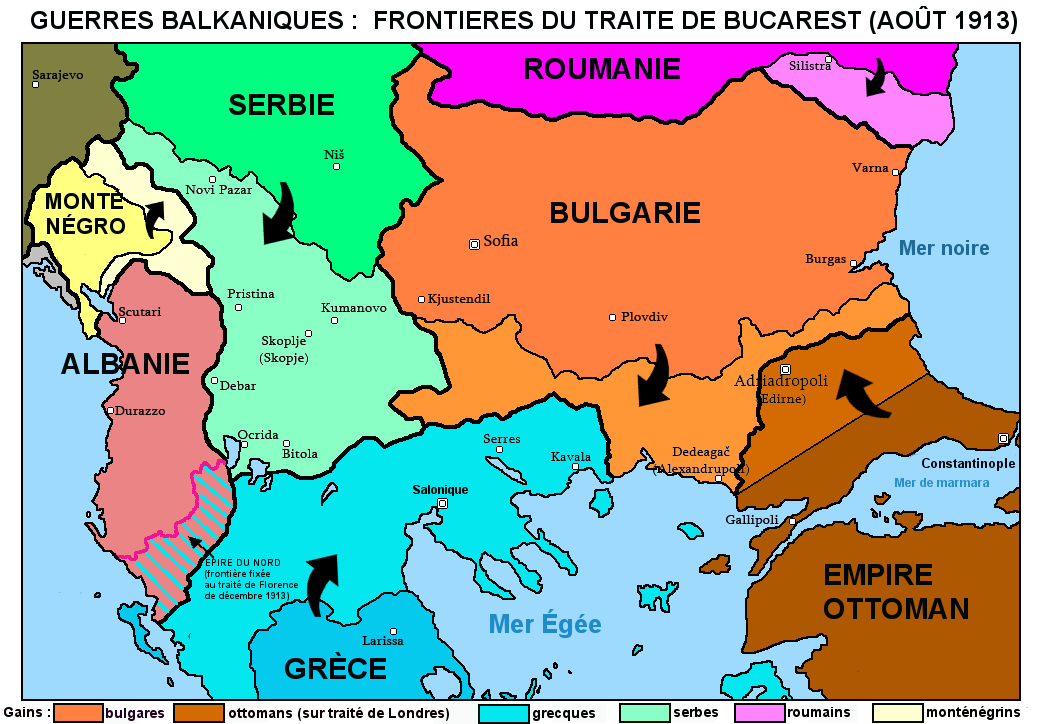
The international borders recognized by the Treaty of Bucharest.

At the end of the Balkan Wars, the Ottomans were practically ousted from Europe: they controlled only part of Eastern Thrace and a small territory in central Albania. The treaties of early 1913 legitimized this retreat but guaranteed the Ottomans the maintenance of a small Ottoman enclave in Thrace, while the small Balkan states experienced significant territorial and demographic expansion.

This ousting left the Ottoman territories in Europe in limbo: quickly, the Bulgarians, Serbs, and Greeks tore each other apart to seize the lion's share; thus, on 25 June 1913, the Bulgarian army attacked the Serbian army without a declaration of war. Initially surprised, the Serbian troops reorganized and, supported by the Greek, Ottoman, and Romanian armies, inflicted severe defeats on Bulgaria, sanctioned by the peace treaty signed in Bucharest on 10 August 1913.

=== Albania occupation ===
Albanian territories were occupied by Serbian and Montenegrin troops: Serbia occupied Durrës and its region, while Montenegro laid siege to Scutari, still held by Ottoman troops. In December 1912, the Conference of Ambassadors allowed for the creation of an Albanian state, neutral, whose existence and borders were guaranteed by the great powers.

In exchange for most of the Sanjak of Novi Pazar, the Serbs committed in London in March 1913 to evacuate the Albanian territories they occupied. It quickly became apparent to the great powers that Serbia and Montenegro were not implementing the clauses of the London Conference, guaranteeing the existence of an Albanian state whose neutrality was guaranteed by the great powers: on 5 August, the multiple violations of the existence of an Albanian state, which the Serbs justified by the anarchy prevailing in Albania and for which Serbia and Montenegro were responsible, prompted the great powers to take a stand in favor of the new state.

This contravention of international law prompted the Austro-Hungarian sovereign Franz Joseph, hostile to any military adventure, to support a show of force by the dual monarchy in the Balkans.

Faced with this situation, Austro-Hungarian officials set out to put an end to it, as this occupation materialized Serbia's rise to power on the Balkan scene: among them, the Prime Minister of Hungary, István Tisza, also advocated a diplomatic showdown with Serbia: indeed, the Hungarian Prime Minister analyzed the Serbian occupation as a coup and perceived the dual monarchy's ability to end it as a manifestation that it still counted among the great powers.

However, during the month of September, the Serbs multiplied contradictory statements in Vienna, managing to avoid addressing the issue with the Austro-Hungarian Minister of Foreign Affairs, Leopold Berchtold: the ambassador in Vienna told the press that the Serbian presence in Albania was intended to act as a barrier to the anarchy developing in the region, while Nikola Pašić, the Serbian Prime Minister, passing through Vienna, was so affable with Count Berchtold, the Minister of Foreign Affairs, that the latter could not bring up the Albanian question with the Serb. This affability disarmed the dual monarchy's diplomats, who repeatedly requested official explanations but received evasive responses. This occupation also aroused the hostility of the Kingdom of Italy, still officially allied with the Reich and the dual monarchy: indeed, the kingdom of Rome aspired to control Albanian territories.

=== Dual monarchy ===
The year 1913 was marked by a deterioration in the position of the dual monarchy: its diplomats failed to block Serbian expansion, Bulgaria failed to do so through arms during the Second Balkan War, and Romania distanced itself from Austro-Hungarian influence.Despite this defeat, the kingdom of Sofia did not remain isolated for long: Austro-Hungarian diplomacy, concerned with limiting the consequences of the Treaty of Bucharest, encouraged Bulgaria to rapprochement with the Sublime Porte, closely linked to the Reich.

In the days preceding the sending of the note to the government of Belgrade, Archduke Franz Ferdinand, heir to the Austrian and Hungarian crowns, opposed sending the note containing the ultimatum to the kingdom of Belgrade; notably, on 16 October, during his meeting with the German Emperor at Konopischt, the residence of the Austro-Hungarian Kronprinz.

== Austro-Hungarian reactions ==
Faced with the dilatory responses of the Serbian government, the imperial and royal government sent a diplomatic note to the royal Serbian government. In this note, the Austro-Hungarians demanded that the Serbian government withdraw its troops from Albania within eight days.

=== Terms ===
The Serbian occupation of Albanian territories forced the dual monarchy to demand from the kingdom of Belgrade the evacuation within eight days of the territories it occupied in central Albania.In case of refusal, the dual monarchy would "deploy appropriate means to ensure that its demands are respected".

=== German support ===
Rapidly, German officials expressed their support for the Austro-Hungarian policy of firmness towards the kingdom of Belgrade, committing to support the dual monarchy if attacked by Serbia in the event of armed conflict.This support materialized through public statements by Wilhelm II. At the same time, Arthur Zimmermann, the main architect of the Reich's foreign policy at that time, multiplied signs of the Reich's support for the dual monarchy.

=== Serbian response ===
On 20 October, the Serbian government informed the Austro-Hungarian government that it accepted the Austro-Hungarian demands and committed to evacuating the Albanian territories occupied by the Serbian army as quickly as possible.

=== Austro-Hungarian demands ===
While the dual monarchy had suffered setbacks since the formation of the Balkan alliance under Russian auspices, the Serbian diplomatic defeat constituted the first success for the dual monarchy since the conclusion of the Bosnian crisis.Benefiting from the support of the Reich, the dual monarchy thus obtained satisfaction for its demands; for its part, Serbia could not count on Russian support.

== Reactions ==
=== Great Powers ===
Allied for the occasion, Vienna and Rome succeeded in ousting the Serbs from the Adriatic, but did not extend their rapprochement, as the rivalries between them, particularly in Albania, were exacerbated.

=== Precedent ===
While the Austro-Hungarian note was addressed to Serbia, the Reich, aware of the precariousness of the German position in the Balkans and the Ottoman Empire, was pushed to approve all initiatives of the dual monarchy in the region.

From the Austro-Hungarian point of view, sending a diplomatic note accompanied by an ultimatum, successful during the Bosnian crisis and then in October 1913, suggested that a new similar approach was likely to succeed; however, the nature of the Serbian response, a mixture of provocations and politeness, led Viennese officials to believe that Serbian leaders only changed their policy when their interlocutors engaged in a showdown.

== See also ==
- Austria-Hungary
- Kingdom of Serbia
- Provisional Government of Albania
- Second Balkan War
- Franz Joseph I of Austria
- Peter I of Serbia
- Leopold Berchtold
- Franz Conrad von Hötzendorf
- Nikola Pašić

== Appendices ==
=== Bibliography ===
- Bled, Jean-Paul (2014). L'agonie d'une monarchie [The Agony of a Monarchy] (in French). Paris: Tallandier. p. 464. ISBN 979-10-210-0440-5.
- Clark, Christopher (2013). Les somnambules [The Sleepwalkers] (in French). Paris: Flammarion. p. 668. ISBN 978-2-08-121648-8.
- Cocher, Francois; Porte, Rémy (2008). Dictionnaire de la grande guerre [Dictionary of the Great War] (in French). Paris: Robert Laffont. p. 1120. ISBN 978-2-221-10722-5.
- Fischer, Fritz (1970). Les Buts de guerre de l'Allemagne impériale [Germany's Aims in the First World War] (in French). Translated by Geneviève Migeon and Henri Thiès. Paris: Éditions de Trévise. p. 654.
- Krumeich, Gerd (2014). Le feu au poudres [The Powder Keg]. Histoire (in French). Paris: Belin. p. 301. ISBN 978-2-7011-9090-7.
- Renouvin, Pierre (1934). La Crise européenne et la Première Guerre mondiale [The European Crisis and the First World War]. Peuples et civilisations (in French). Paris: Presses universitaires de France. p. 779.
- Schiavon, Max (2011). L'Autriche-Hongrie dans la Première Guerre mondiale: La fin d'un empire [Austria-Hungary in the First World War: The end of an empire]. Les Nations dans la Grande Guerre (in French). Paris: Éditions SOTECA, 14-18 Éditions. p. 298. ISBN 978-2-916385-59-4.
- Seiti, Arta (2015). Des guerres balkaniques à la Grande Guerre: un regard stratégique [From the Balkan Wars to the Great War: A strategic view] (in French). Paris: Les Cahiers de la Revue Défense Nationale. ISSN 2105-7508.
