= Rudolf von Eichthal =

Austrian writer

- Born: 18 March 1877; Moravská Třebová, Austria-Hungary
- Died: 17 August 1974 (aged 97); Vienna, Austria
- Occupation: Writer

Rudolf von Eichthal (18 March 1877 – 17 August 1974) was an Austrian writer. His work was part of the literature event in the art competition at the 1936 Summer Olympics.
