= Schönhengstgau =

Historical region of the Sudetenland

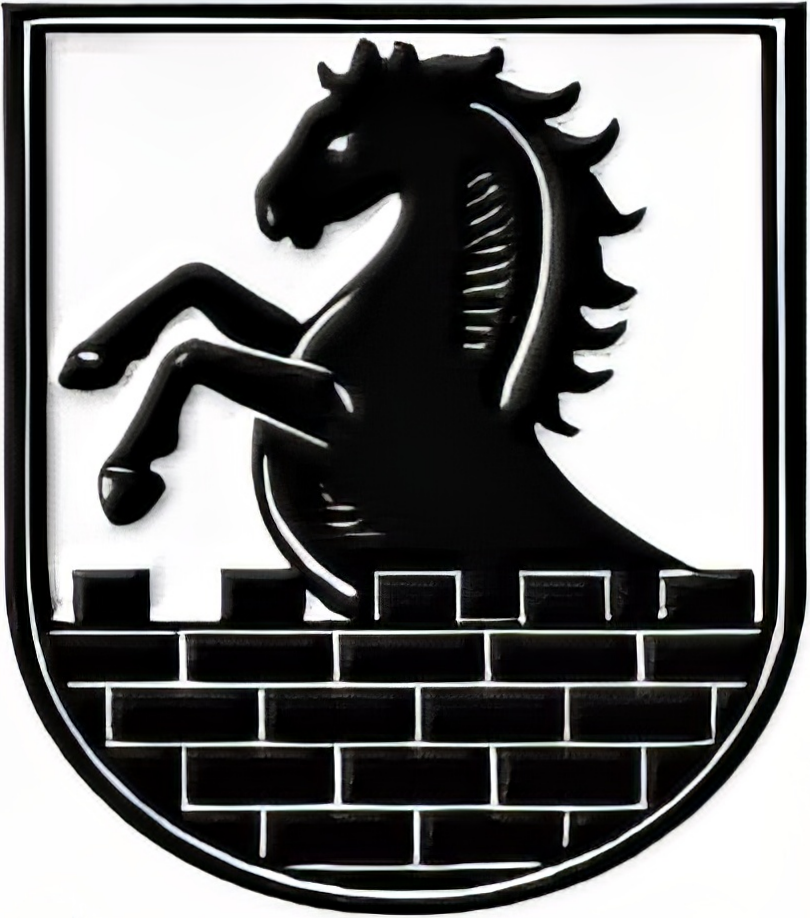
Unofficial coat of arms of the Schönhengstgau - used e.g. by Schönhengster Heimatbund e.V.

The Schönhengstgau (Czech: Hřebečsko) is a historical region in Bohemia and Moravia, which, however, did not form a unity either in terms of landscape or politics. Until the end of World War II, it was the largest German language island in Czechoslovakia.

== Geography ==
The Schönhengstgau is named after the Schönhengster ridge in the Bohemian-Moravian Highlands. It stretched on both sides of the Bohemian-Moravian border; in the north it was separated from the predominantly German-speaking county of Glatz by a narrow strip populated by Czechs. The largest cities are Svitavy (German: Zwittau), Moravská Třebová (German: Mährisch Trübau) and Lanškroun (German: Landskron).

In terms of landscape, the Schönhengstgau is divided from west to east into:

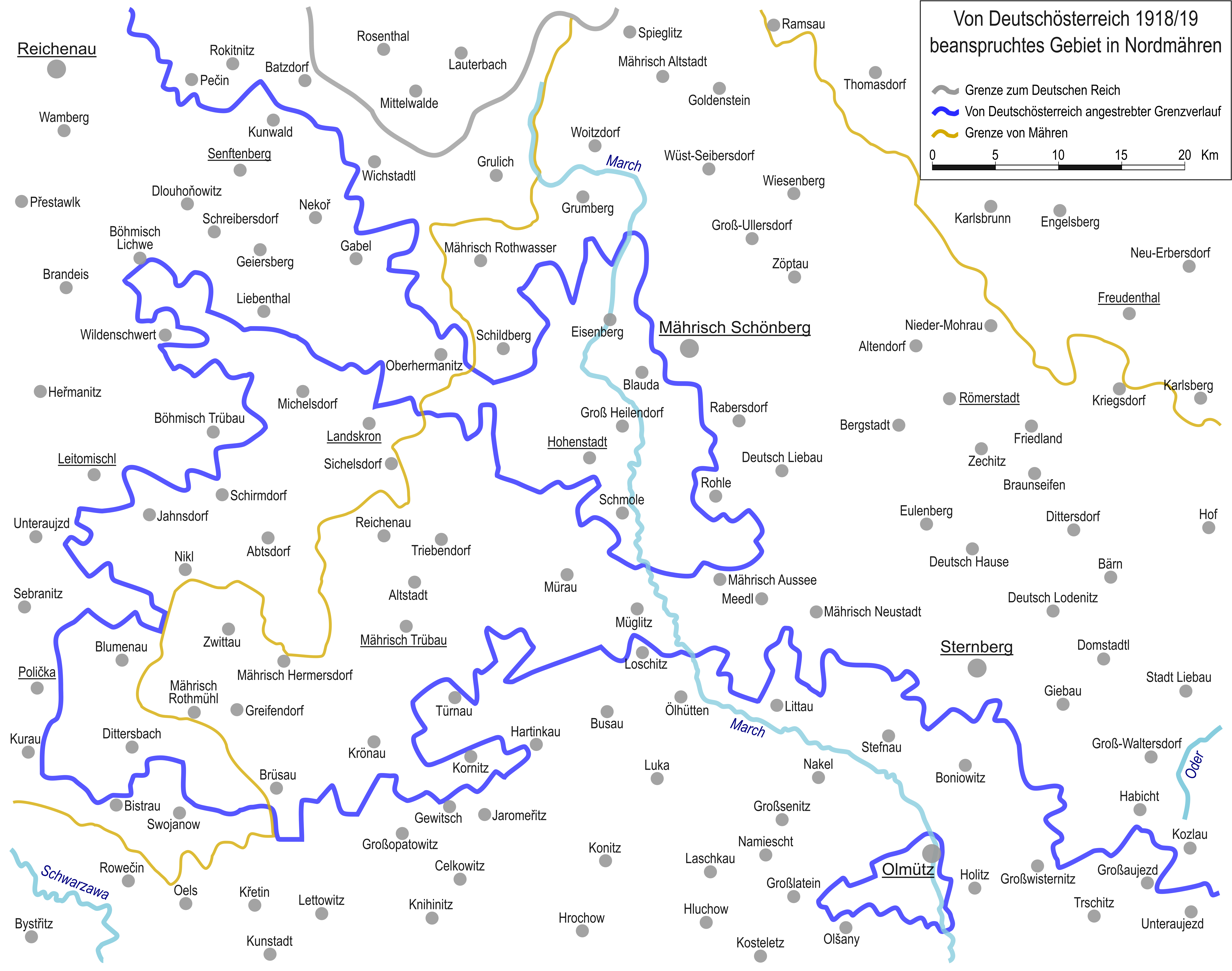
Border demarcation in the Schönhengstgau area sought by the Republic of German-Austria in 1918/19

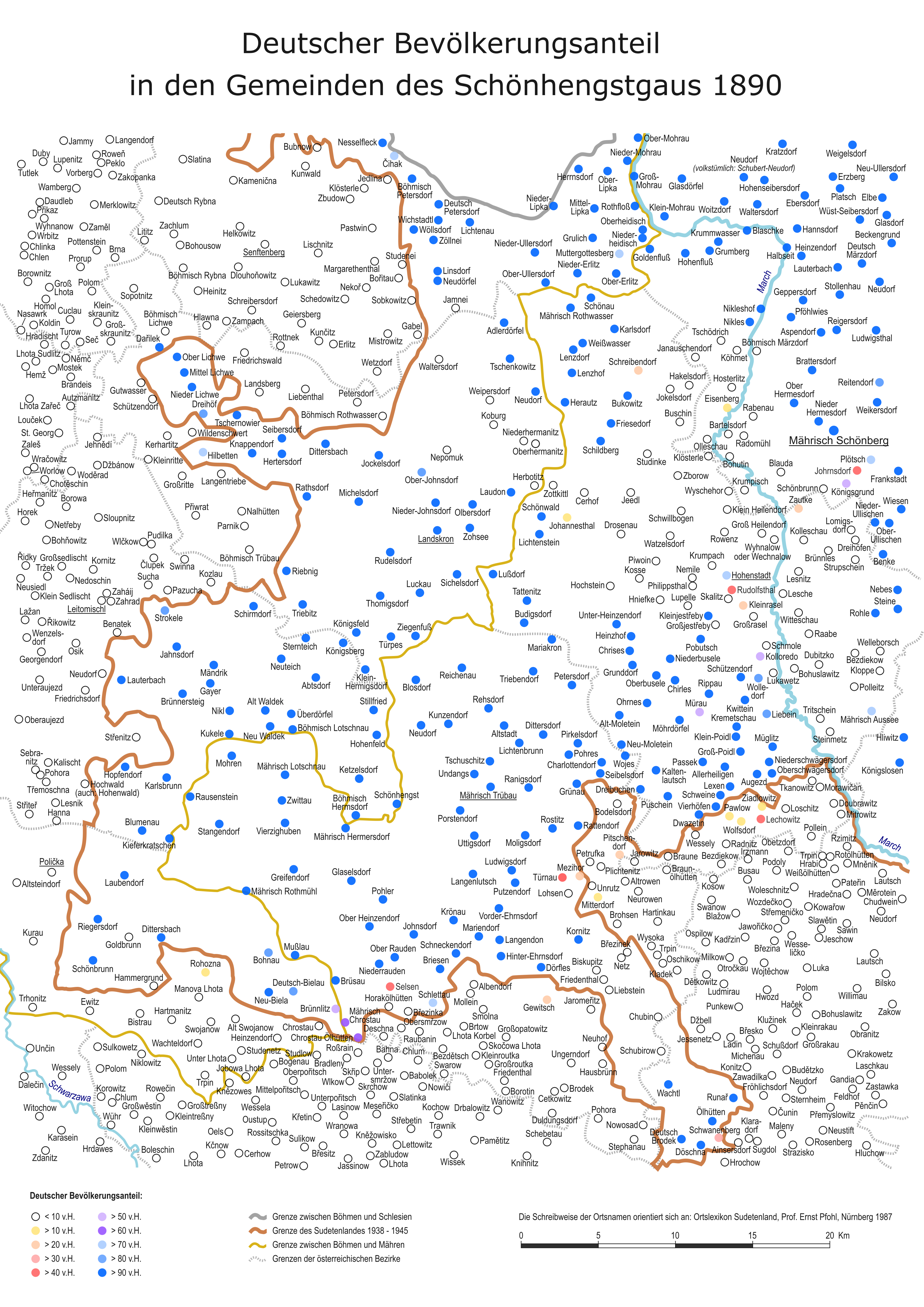
Percentage of German population in the cities and villages of the Schönhengstgau area

- the Oberland, a flat, higher basin of the Zwitta river with the adjacent parts of Bohemia in the north and west
- the Landskroner Kessel, in the north of which rises the Eagle Mountains with the almost 1000m high Black Mountain and the Buchberg
- the lowlands with the Reichenauer Berg, the Eichwald and the Moravian Steinberg range
- the Mürau mountains with their steep mountain slopes, deep valleys and dense forest
- the March plain, which forms the eastern border of the Schönhengsgau and is traversed by the March, the main river of Moravia.

According to Marie Macková, the region was probably defined for the first time in 1813. The author of the then definition of the region, Josef Jurende, defined it as "a territory mostly inhabited by Germans". According to him, the center of the region was the cities of Zwittau and Mährisch Trübau, the border points Landskron, Leitomischl and Hohenstadt.

The territory was by no means geographically or economically uniform. It even crossed the border between Bohemia and Moravia. Gustav Korkisch in his history of Schönhengstau states that in 1850 the territory included areas of the judicial districts of Gewitsch (Jevíčko), Mährisch Trübau, Zwittau, Hohenstadt and Müglitz in Moravia, and in Bohemia the judicial districts of Landskron, Wildenschwert (Ústí nad Orlicí), Leitomischl (Litomyšl) and Politschka (Polička). However, except for the Landskron district they only belonged partly to Schönhengstgau, which means the region was clearly defined only by its "cultural and national belonging", not politically or geographically.

== History ==
Until the Middle Ages, the Schönhengster Land area was covered by almost impenetrable jungle, through which only a few, very narrow trade routes led. Over the centuries, this jungle had protected Bohemia from the invasions of eastern equestrian peoples. The area originally belonged to the Slavnikid noble family and, as the oldest Bohemian historian Cosmas reports, stretched from Luthomisl Castle to the little Svitava crest in the middle of the forest.

The settlement was established as part of the German Ostsiedlung around 1250 in what had previously been hardly inhabited land. A number of villages were assigned to each of the cities founded, so that the area was able to assert itself as a German language island until 1945. The work of Bruno von Schauenburg (bishop of Olomouc), who came from the well-known Holstein family of the Counts of Schaumburg, was of particular importance for all of Moravia. Many German towns and villages in Schönhengstgau and Kuhländchen owed their existence to his planned colonization activities.

The ancestors of the German residents had mostly emigrated from Main Franconia. The Schönehengst dialect was therefore influenced by Central German and Franconian. However, the dialect was not uniform; instead, five to seven different dialect areas were distinguished - depending on the settlement of the individual rulers. In some of these areas the dialect showed Upper German influences. The differences were mainly phonetic, but they also extended to vocabulary. The manner of speaking was generally deliberate.

Since 1526 the region was ruled by the House of Habsburg and its successor, the House of Habsburg-Lorraine and remained part of Austria until the End of World War I.

On October 4, 1750, a carved miraculous image by the Trübau sculptor Franz Seydtl - previously venerated in the forest - was ceremoniously transferred to the high altar of the Reichenau parish church and Reichenau was officially declared a place of pilgrimage by the church authorities. In the period that followed, up to 2,000 pilgrims gathered here on some days. As early as 1750 there were five priests working in Reichenau, and in later years there were up to ten priests. On July 3, 1932, the ceremonial inauguration of a new forest chapel took place by the Olomouc Auxiliary Bishop Dr. Josef Schnitzel with around 30,000 guests. Reichenau is the only church-recognized place of pilgrimage in Schönhengstgau. Especially on the occasion of the birth of the Virgin Mary (September 8th), numerous processions of pilgrims came to Reichenau.

Immediately after the end of the World War I, the Republic of German-Austria, citing the peoples' right to self-determination, along with other parts of Bohemia, Moravia and Austrian Silesia, laid claim to the Schönhengstgau. This was opposed by the occupation by the Czechoslovak military. The area was finally awarded to Czechoslovakia in September 1919 through the Treaty of Saint-Germain.

The Schönhengstgau was separated from the closed German-speaking area by a Czech-populated strip near Hohenstadt and around Senftenberg. Before the Second World War, over 126,000 residents lived in the 148 communities, including the six towns of Zwittau, Brüsau, Mährisch-Trübau, Landskron, Hohenstadt and Müglitz, 84% of whom were German.

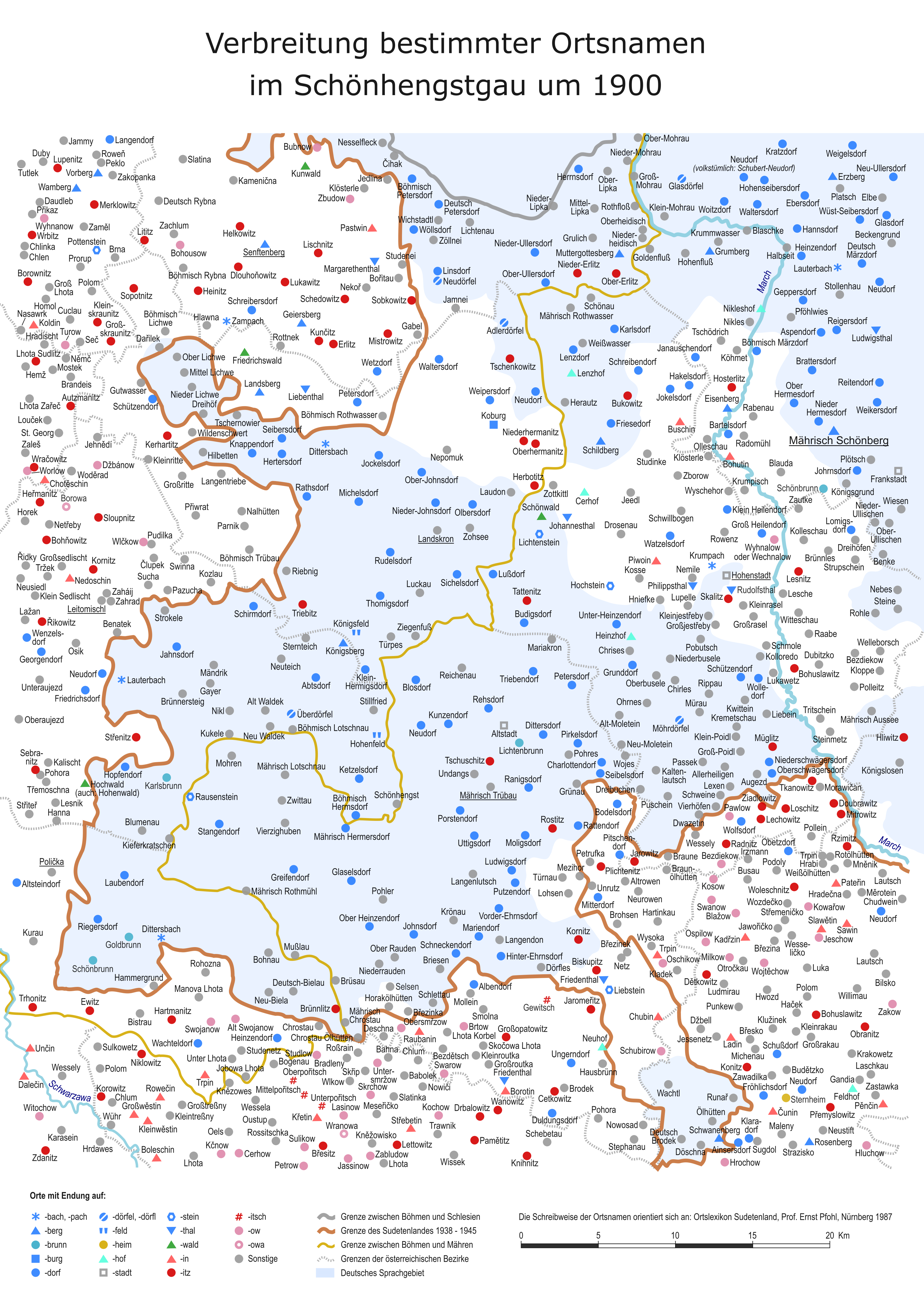
The former German place names in Schönhengstgau and its surrounding area

The region came to Germany in 1938 as part of the Sudetenland through the Munich Agreement. The German administration established the four districts (Landkreise) of Landskron, Zwittau, Mährisch-Trübau and Hohenstadt in the Schönhengstgau area.

Shortly after the end of World War II, from May 17 - 21, 1945, the Massacre in Lanškroun (German: Landskron) happened. Czech partisans drove all the Germans into the market square. A large table was set up on the sidewalk in front of the district office. The so-called People's Court took its place there. Those who had been singled out as guilty had to appear before the judge's table after being forced to slide on their knees for the last twenty steps. The sentences were either corporal punishment or death by shooting or hanging. Around 40 people where killed, more than 100 persons were punished in public with flogging between 10 and 100 strokes. Since the sentences were carried out almost immediately, these events are also called the Landskron Blood Court.

The territory came back to Czechoslovakia in 1945 and once Czech authorities gained control, they expelled almost all of the German population until the end of 1946. First national cleansing activities and "liquidation of the Germans" started already in May 1945. The main role in these activities in the area of Schönhengstgau was assumed by units of the Czechoslovak army and partisan groups, especially the partisan group "Václavík". On May 15, gen. Zdeněk Novák issued an order to occupy the border areas with the postscript "expel all Germans from the historical territories", but the units mostly carried out their actions independently, they were characterized by considerable harshness, violent house searches. The resettlement was initially carried out by these guerrilla formations in cooperation with local authorities, after which the leading role in these activities, accompanied by frequent excesses, was taken over by soldiers under the command of the 14th Division. The activities of individual companies I.-III affected the area of Lanškrounsk. battalion of the 30th Infantry Regiment with headquarters in Ústí nad Orlicí. The railway in the northwest direction was also used for displacement. According to the decree of June 12, the territory occupied by the Poles was not used for the removal, but the railway in the northwest direction to Tetschen/Děčín and then to Dresden in Germany and from the area of II. to other parts in Saxony via Teplitz-Schönau/Teplice-Šenov. The partisans then organized the so-called "wild expulsion", possibly also the associated revolutionary tribunals, such as the People's Court in Landskron/Lanškroun and elsewhere.

== Economy ==
Agriculture was the most important industry, and machinery, textiles and goods made of gold and silver were also produced in the area.

== Notable people ==
- Antonín Brus of Mohelnice (1518– 1580), Archbishop of Prague.
- Filip Fabricius (1570–1632), Bohemian Catholic officer (being thrown out of the Prague Castle window).
- Jan Marek Marci (1595–1667), Doctor and scientist, rector of the University of Prague.
- Carolus Polodig (1671–1714), Roman Catholic prelate.
- Hermann Edler von Zeissl (1817–1884), Austrian Jewish dermatologist.
- Carl Giskra (1820–1879), Statesman of the Austrian Empire.
- Karl Kořistka (1825–1906), Geographer, cartographer, mathematician and professor..
- Oswald Ottendorfer (1826–1900), United States journalist.
- Edmund Reitter (1845–1920), Austrian entomologist, writer and a collector.
- Karl Penka (1847–1912), Austrian philologist and anthropologist.
- Emil Müller (1861–1927), Austrian mathematician.
- Friedrich Gustav Piffl (1864–1932), Cardinal of the Roman Catholic Church and Archbishop of Vienna.
- Max Bernhauer (1866–1946), Austrian entomologist.
- Jan Eskymo Welzl (1868–1948), Czech-Moravian traveller, adventurer, gold-digger, and Eskimo chief.
- Rudolf von Eichthal (1877–1974), Austrian writer.
- Richard Schmitz (1885–1954), Austrian politician.
- Walther Hensel (1887–1956), German musicologist and music educator.
- Maximilian Felzmann (1894–1962), Austrian general in the Wehrmacht.
- Oskar Schindler (1908-1974), German industrialist who saved the lives of 1,200 Jews during the Holocaust.
- Gert Wilden (1917–2015), German film composer.
- Herwig Schopper (born 1924), Experimental physicist.
- Ctirad Kohoutek (1929–2011), Contemporary Czech composer, music theorist, and pedagogue.
- Luboš Kohoutek (born 1935), Czech astronomer and a discoverer of minor planets and comets
- Heidi Lück (born 1943), German politician who was a member of the Landtag of Bavaria.
