= Skřípov =

- Municipality
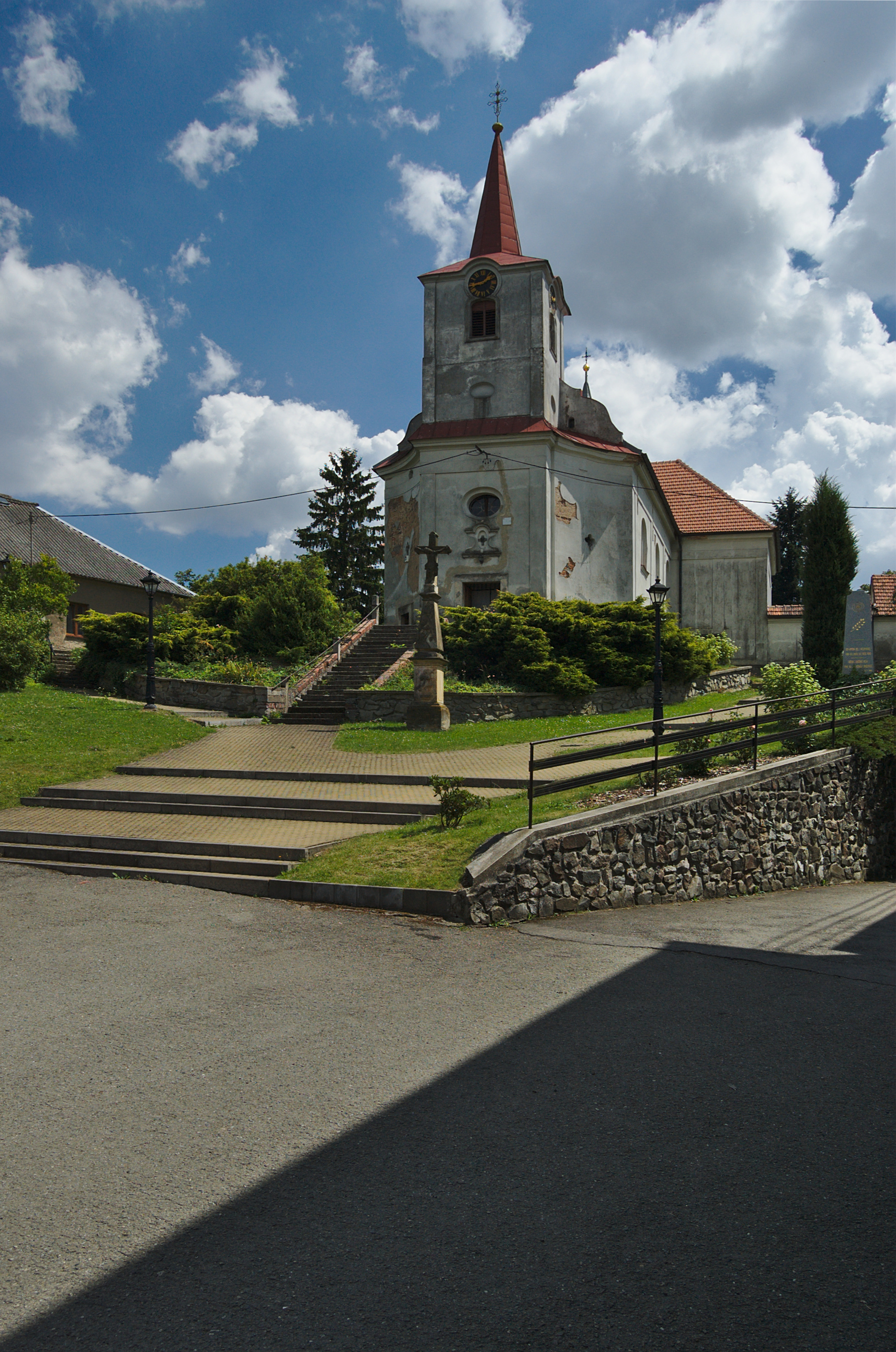
- Church of the Ascension of the Lord

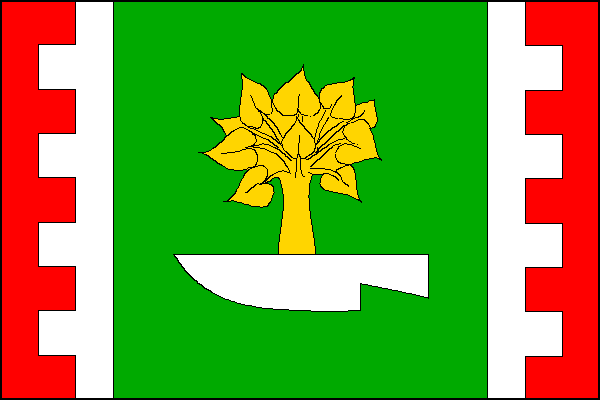
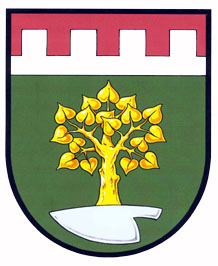
- Flag Coat of arms

- Location in the Czech Republic
- Coordinates: 49°35′0″N 16°49′13″E
- Country: Czech Republic
- Region: Olomouc
- District: Prostějov
- First mentioned: 1553

Area
  - Total: 11.08 km^{2} (4.28 sq mi)
- Elevation: 578 m (1,896 ft)

Population (2026-01-01)
  - Total: 335
  - Density: 30.2/km^{2} (78.3/sq mi)
- Time zone: UTC+1 (CET)
  - Summer (DST): UTC+2 (CEST)
- Postal code: 798 52
- Website: www.ou-skripov.cz

Skřípov (German: Wachtl) is a municipality and village in Prostějov District in the Olomouc Region of the Czech Republic. It has about 300 inhabitants.

Skřípov lies approximately 25 kilometres (16 mi) north-west of Prostějov, 32 km (20 mi) west of Olomouc, and 182 km (113 mi) east of Prague.

== Demographics ==
Historical population
Year	Pop.	±%
1869	1,934	—
1880	2,066	+6.8%
1890	2,086	+1.0%
1900	1,921	−7.9%
1910	1,797	−6.5%
1921	1,653	−8.0%
1930	1,566	−5.3%
1950	612	−60.9%
1961	642	+4.9%
1970	513	−20.1%
1980	440	−14.2%
1991	350	−20.5%
2001	346	−1.1%
2011	347	+0.3%
2021	305	−12.1%
Source: Censuses
