= 1914 (film) =

1931 film directed by Richard Oswald

- Eugen Klöpfer (left) as Emperor Franz Josef
- Directed by: Richard Oswald
- Written by: Heinz Goldberg; Fritz Wendhausen
- Produced by: Richard Oswald
- Starring: Albert Bassermann; Hermann Wlach; Wolfgang von Schwindt; Reinhold Schünzel
- Cinematography: Mutz Greenbaum
- Edited by: Paul Falkenberg
- Production company: Richard-Oswald-Produktion
- Distributed by: Atlas Film
- Release date: 20 January 1931
- Running time: 112 minutes
- Country: Germany
- Language: German

1914 (German: 1914, die letzten Tage vor dem Weltbrand) is a 1931 German drama film directed by Richard Oswald and starring Albert Bassermann, Hermann Wlach and Wolfgang von Schwindt. The film focuses on the leadership of the Great Powers of Europe in the days leading up to the outbreak of the First World War, culminating in the assassination of Archduke Franz Ferdinand of Austria by Gavrilo Princip. It was produced at the Babelsberg Studios in Berlin and premiered in the city at the Tauentzien-Palast on 20 January 1931. At the request of the German Foreign Office an introduction by Eugen Fischer-Baling was filmed and presented at the start of the film. A special screening was held at the Reichstag on 3 March 1931.

== Cast ==
- Albert Bassermann as Count Bethmann-Hollweg
- Hermann Wlach as Count von Jagow
- Wolfgang von Schwindt as Count von Moltke
- Reinhold Schünzel as Czar Nicholas II
- Robert Hartberg as Count Hoyos
- Lucie Höflich as The Czarina
- Ferdinand Hart as Archduke Nicholas
- Oskar Homolka as Sazonov
- Adolf E. Licho as Suchomlinov
- Hans Peppler as Count Friedrich Pourtalès
- Theodor Loos as Paléologue
- Fritz Alberti as Buchanan
- Eugen Klöpfer as Emperor Franz Josef
- Alfred Abel as Count Berchtold
- Victor Jensen as Count Tisza
- Ferdinand von Alten as Viviani
- Bruno Ziener as Count von Schöen
- Heinrich George as Jean Jaurès
- Alexander Granach as Friend of Jaurès
- Paul Mederow as Edward Grey, 1st Viscount Grey of Fallodon
- Fritz Odemar as Karl Max, Prince Lichnowsky
- Carl Goetz as Jules Cambon
- Bernhard Goetzke as King Peter of Serbia
- Olaf Fjord as Crown Prince Alexander
- Adolf Klein as Pašić
- Lionel Royce as Maklakov
- Viktor de Kowa as Grand Duke Michael
- Paul Bildt as Nicolson
- Carl Balhaus as Gavrilo Princip
- Eugen Burg as Baron von Giesl
- Ernst Dernburg as A general
- Hugo Flink as von Szapary
- Alfred Gerasch as Conrad von Hötzendorff
- Karl Gerhardt as Eugen Kettler, Kammerdiener des Kaisers
- Fred Goebel as Grand Duke Dimitri
- Alice Hechy as Alexandra Alexandrowna
- Hermann Heilinger as Januskewitsch
- Heinrich Schroth as War Minister von Falkenhayn
- Karl Staudt as Count Szőgyény-Marich
- Ottó Torday as Count Stefan Tisza
- Michael von Newlinsky as Untersuchungsrichter
- Eugen Fischer-Baling as himself in prologue

== Bibliography ==
- Prawer, Siegbert Salomon (2005). Between Two Worlds: The Jewish Presence in German and Austrian Film, 1910–1933. New York: Berghahn Books. ISBN 978-1-84545-074-8.
