= János Forgách =

Austro-Hungarian diplomat

Austro-Hungarian Minister to Brazil
- In office 29 October 1905 – 19 June 1907
- Preceded by: Eugen Ritter von Kuczyński
- Succeeded by: Franz Freiherr Riedl von Riedenau

Austro-Hungarian Minister to Serbia
- In office 19 June 1907 – 30 April 1911
- Preceded by: Moritz Freiherr Czikann von Wahlborn
- Succeeded by: István Ugron de Ábránfalva

Austro-Hungarian Minister to Saxony
- In office 30 April 1911 – 8 October 1913
- Preceded by: Karl Emil Prinz zu Fürstenberg
- Succeeded by: Karl Freiherr von Braun

Second Section Chief in the Imperial Foreign Ministry
- In office 8 October 1913 – 4 January 1917
- Preceded by: Friedrich Graf Szapáry von Muraszombath, Széchysziget und Szapár
- Succeeded by: Ludwig Freiherr von Flotow

Personal details
- Born: 24 October 1870 Gács, Austria-Hungary (now Slovakia)
- Died: 25 September 1935 (aged 64) Budapest, Hungary
- Spouse(s): Gabriella, née Lovassy de Szakál (1889–1972)
- Relations: House of Forgách

Count János Forgách de Ghymes et Gács (German: Johann Graf Forgách von Ghymes und Gács) (24 October 1870 – 25 September 1935), was an Austro-Hungarian diplomat of Hungarian origin who played a prominent role during World War I and in particular the July Crisis.

== Life ==
Born in Gács (now Halič) on 24 October 1870 into a prominent Hungarian noble family as son of Count Antal Forgách de Ghymes et Gács (1819–1885), who had been of the few Hungarian magnates taking the side of Austria in 1848 and served as Section Chief in the Imperial Foreign Ministry in the 1850s. In 1908, he married Gabriella Lovassy de Szakál (1889–1972) in Budapest and the couple had three children.

In October 1905, Count Forgách received his first major posting as minister at Rio de Janeiro. In June 1907, he transferred to Belgrade where he played a significant role during the Bosnian crisis of 1908. However, he discredited himself the following year during the so-called Friedjung Process which involved forgery of documents a highly publicised treason trial in Agram (now Zagreb) and was sent into professional exile in 1911 as minister at Dresden.

With the appointment of Count Berchtold as Imperial Foreign Minister in 1912, Count Forgách made a comeback in the autumn of 1913 as Second Section Chief (equivalent to head of the Political Section) at the Ballhausplatz. A good friend of Count Berchtold from a young age, he became one of the Foreign Minister's closest advisors and confidants. Together with Count Hoyos, Berchtold's chef de cabinet, he was one of the so-called young rebels, a group of younger diplomats who favoured a more aggressive foreign policy of the Dual Monarchy. During the July Crisis of 1914, Count Forgách played a significant role in the preparations of the Austro-Hungarian ultimatum to Serbia and was a vocal advocate for war against Serbia.

Considered talented and ambitious, Count Forgách remained in his post at the Ballhausplatz until January 1917. In 1918, he was dispatched to Kiev as a representative of the Dual Monarchy. After the Bolsheviks came to power in Russia in November 1917, Austria-Hungary had negotiated a separate peace treaty with the newly created Ukrainian People's Republic that was signed on 9 February 1918. The so-called Bread Peace was supposed to solve the Dual Monarchy's food supply problem, but as Count Forgách quickly discovered this proved to be an illusion. He remained in Kiev until November 1918 as the situation in Ukraine only became more and more chaotic.

After the war, Count Forgách retired and spent his remaining years in Budapest where he died on 25 September 1935.

Diplomatic posts
| Preceded by Eugen Ritter von Kuczyński | Austro-Hungarian Minister to Brazil; 1905–1907 | Succeeded by Franz Freiherr Riedl von Riedenau |
| Preceded by Moritz Freiherr Czikann von Wahlborn | Austro-Hungarian Minister to Serbia; 1907–1911 | Succeeded by István Ugron de Ábránfalva |
| Preceded by Karl Emil Prinz zu Fürstenberg | Austro-Hungarian Minister to Saxony; 1911–1913 | Succeeded by Karl Freiherr von Braun |
| Preceded by Friedrich Graf Szapáry von Muraszombath, Széchysziget und Szapár | Second Section Chief in the Imperial Foreign Ministry; 1913–1917 | Succeeded by Ludwig Freiherr von Flotow |
