= Frigyes Szapáry =

Austro-Hungarian diplomat (1869-1935)

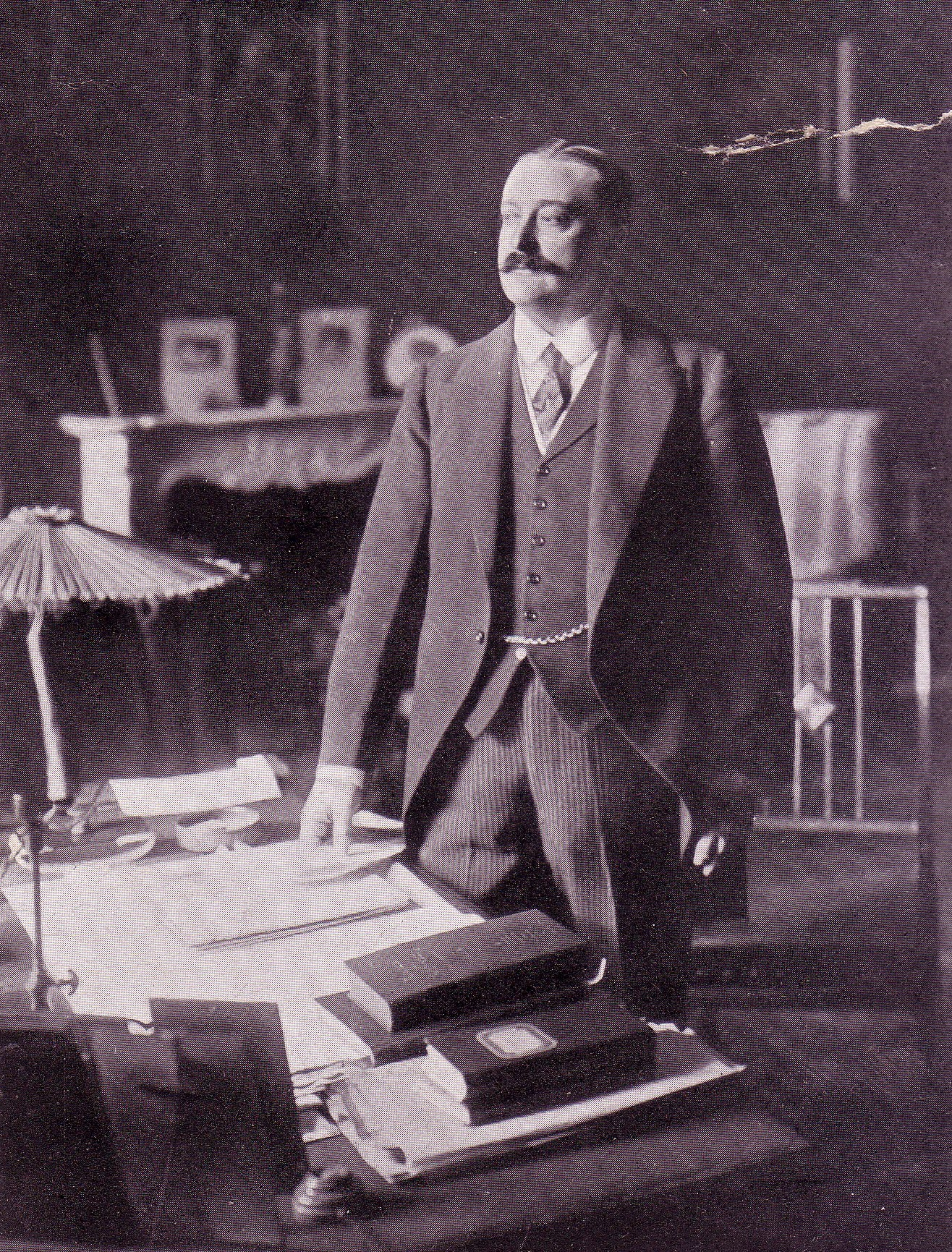

Chef de cabinet of the Imperial Foreign Minister
- In office 10 December 1909 – 20 April 1912
- Preceded by: Maximilian Freiherr von Gagern
- Succeeded by: Alexander Graf von Hoyos, Freiherr zu Stichsenstein

Second Section Chief in the Imperial Foreign Ministry
- In office 20 April 1912 – 1 October 1913
- Preceded by: Karl Freiherr von Macchio
- Succeeded by: Johann Graf Forgách von Ghymes und Gács

Austro-Hungarian Ambassador to Russia
- In office 1 October 1913 – 6 August 1914
- Preceded by: Duglas Graf von Thurn und Valsássina-Como-Vercelli
- Succeeded by: None

Personal details
- Born: 15 November 1869 Budapest, Austria-Hungary (now Hungary)
- Died: 18 March 1935 (aged 65) Vienna, Austria
- Spouse(s): Hedwig, née Prinzessin zu Windisch-Grätz (1878–1918)
- Children: 4
- Parents: László Szapáry; Marianne Gräfin von Grünne

Count Frigyes Szapáry de Szapár, Muraszombat et Széchy-Sziget (15 November 1869 – 18 March 1935), was an Austro-Hungarian diplomat of Hungarian origin serving as ambassador to St. Petersburg at the outbreak of World War I and who played a key role during the July Crisis of 1914.

== Life ==
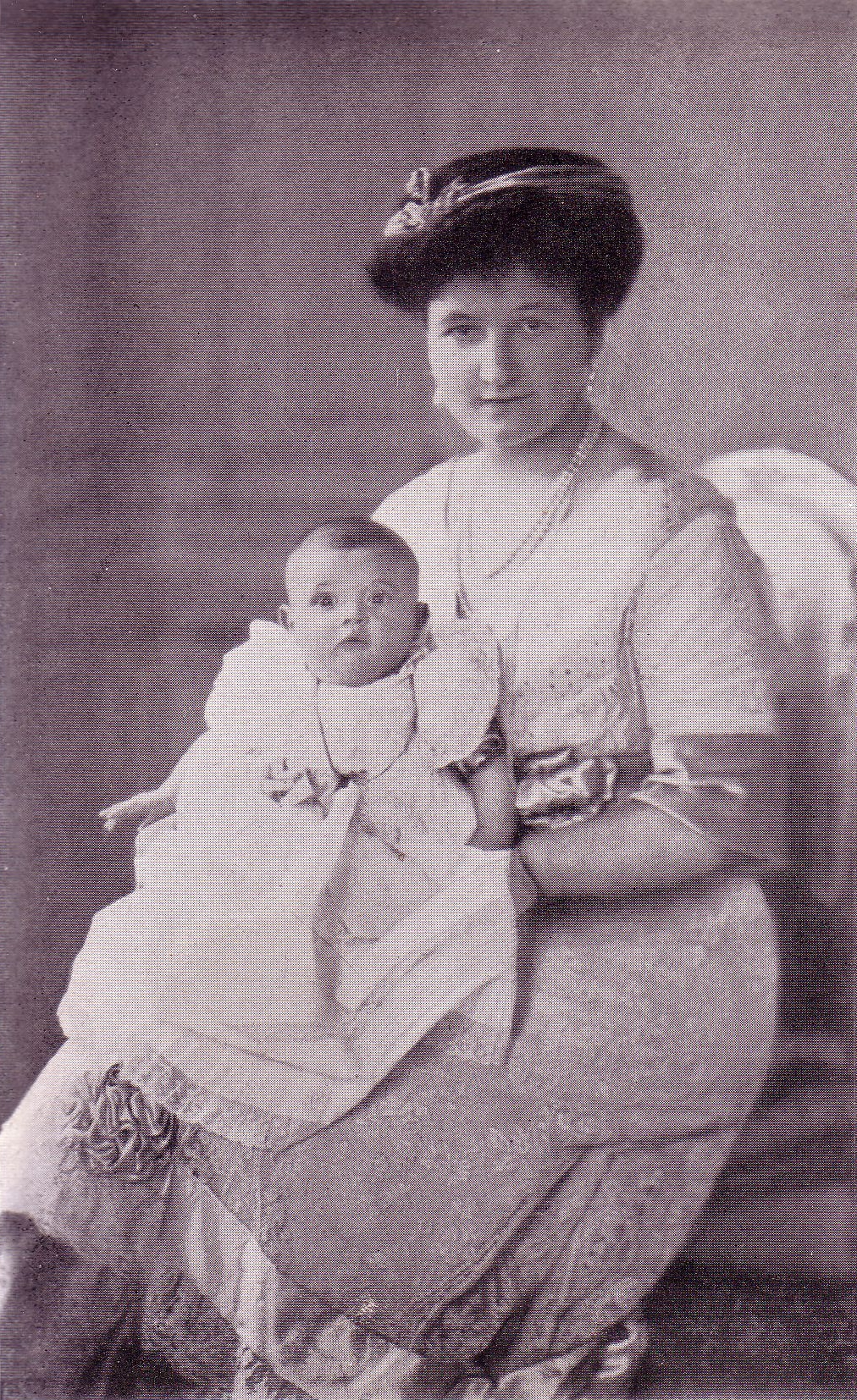
Hedwig von Szapáry with daughter. St. Peterburg, 1914.

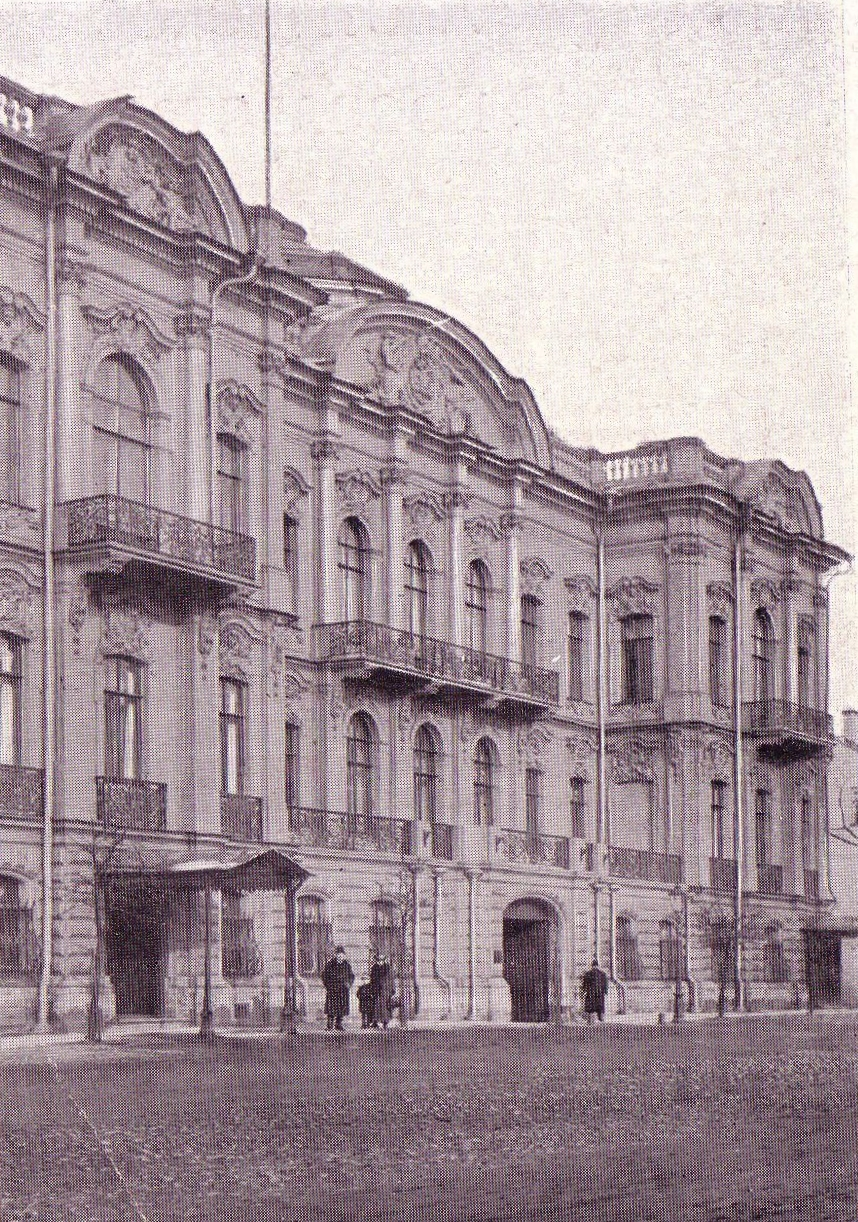
The Austro-Hungarian Embassy building in St Petersburg, Russia, shortly before World War I, 1914.

Born in Budapest on 15 November 1869 into a prominent Hungarian House of Szapáry, as the second son of Count László Szapáry (1831–1883), an Austro-Hungarian general who had played a leading role in the occupation of Bosnia and Herzegovina in 1878, and his wife, Countess Marianne von Grünne (1835-1906), a great-granddaughter of Prince Ferdinand von Trauttmansdorff-Weinsberg. He was also a cousin of Count Gyula Szapáry, Prime Minister of Hungary from 1890 to 1892.

On 27 April 1908, he married Princess Hedwig von Windisch-Graetz (1878–1918), eldest daughter of Alfred Fürst zu Windisch-Grätz and his wife, Princess Marie Gabrielle Eleonore von Auersperg (1855–1933). Her father had been Minister President of Austria from 1893 to 1895 and served as President of the Imperial Council. The couple had four children of which the daughter, Countess Marianne (1911–1988), was the mother of Princess Michael of Kent.

Following studies in law, Count Szapáry joined the Austro-Hungarian foreign service and began his diplomatic career in 1895 as an attaché in Rome, followed by postings in Berlin in 1899 and Munich in 1903. In 1907, he returned to Vienna to serve in the Foreign Ministry at the Ballhausplatz and made a rapid career. Considered a rising star he was appointed as chef de cabinet to Foreign Minister Count Lexa von Aehrenthal in December 1909, a post that allowed him to exercise considerable influence over policy-making. Considered a protégé of Aehrenthal, he belonged to a group of younger diplomats (together with Count von Hoyos and Count von Forgách) who believed that the Dual Monarchy could only be saved from disintegration by a more aggressive and dynamic foreign policy. During the Balkan crisis, he had favoured armed intervention against Serbia. In April 1912, he was appointed to Second Section Chief, which was equivalent to head of the Political Section, in a period of international turmoil. Described as "gifted, quick, hard-working, and a bit mysterious", Aehrenthal's successor Count Berchtold lauded him as for "his outstanding skill in handling political issues and his judgment which far exceeded the norm".

On 1 October 1913, Count Szapáry was appointed as ambassador at St. Petersburg which was significant in the sense that he was considered a Russophobe and was far less willing to accommodate the Russians than his predecessor had been. However, he did not arrive until early the following year and he presented his credentials to the Tsar first on 14 February 1914. Due to pressing family matters, he had to leave within two weeks and returned to St. Petersburg in mid-April, staying until late May. He returned only in mid-July which meant that the Dual Monarchy lacked its chief diplomat in the Russian capital during the Sarajevo crisis, daily business being conducted by Count Czernin as chargé d'affaires.

Once back to St. Petersburg on 17 July, Count Szapáry came to play a significant role. At a diplomatic reception on 21 July, he had a sharp exchange with the visiting French President Poincaré and he held several meetings with Russian Foreign Minister Sazonov over the following days. However, as war proved inevitable it eventually fell upon him to deliver the Austro-Hungarian declaration of war against Russia on 6 August, whereupon he left St. Petersburg.

In 1915, he became a member of the Upper House (Herrenhaus), but played no further major role during the war. He was the maternal grandfather of Princess Michael of Kent.

Count Szapáry died in Vienna on 18 March 1935.

== Works ==
- 'Das Verhältnis österreich-Ungarns zu Russland' in Eduard Ritter von Steinitz (ed.), Rings um Sasonow, Berlin, Verlag für Kulturpolitik, 1928.
- 'Aus den Krisenjahren 1908 bis 1913', in Eduard Ritter von Steinitz (ed.), Erinnerungen an Franz Joseph I, Berlin, Verlag für Kulturpolitik, 1931.

Diplomatic posts
Preceded by Maximilian Freiherr von Gagern	Chef de cabinet of the Imperial Foreign Minister; 1909–1912	Succeeded by Alexander Graf von Hoyos, Freiherr zu Stichsenstein
Preceded by Karl Freiherr von Macchio	Second Section Chief in the Imperial Foreign Ministry; 1912–1913	Succeeded by Johann Graf Forgách von Ghymes und Gács
Preceded by Duglas Graf von Thurn und Valsássina-Como-Vercelli	Austro-Hungarian Ambassador to Russia; 1913–1914	Succeeded by None
