= Hoyos Mission =

Austro-Hungarian mission before WWI

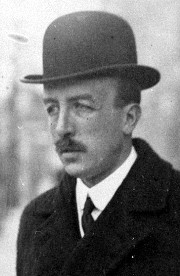
Alexander Hoyos, Leopold Berchtold's chief of staff, gave his name to the mission for which he was responsible.

The Hoyos Mission describes Austro-Hungarian Foreign Minister Leopold Berchtold's dispatch of his promising 38-year-old private secretary, Alexander Hoyos, to meet with his German counterparts. This secret mission was intended to provide Austro-Hungarian policy-makers with information on the Reich's (Note: Between the proclamation of the German Empire in 1871 and its dissolution in 1945, the official name of the German state was Deutsches Reich, subsequently referred to by the legal term Reich.) intentions shortly after the assassination of Franz Ferdinand of Austria, the Imperial and Royal Kronprinz, in Sarajevo. On 5 July 1914, a week after the assassination attempt that claimed the lives of the heir to the throne and his wife, the Austro-Hungarian government sought to officially secure the Reich's support for the actions it wished to take against Serbia in response to the attack. Indeed, the initiatives of the Kingdom of Serbia, victorious in the two Balkan wars, prompted Austro-Hungarian officials to adopt a firm stance in the international crisis opened by the assassination of the Austro-Hungarian heir.

== Context ==
Immediately after the assassination on the imperial and royal heir Franz Ferdinand, the leading Austro-Hungarian officials, initially indecisive, held intensive discussions to determine the political response. Among the options open to them, military action against Serbia was quickly ruled out.

=== The dual monarchy in June 1914 ===
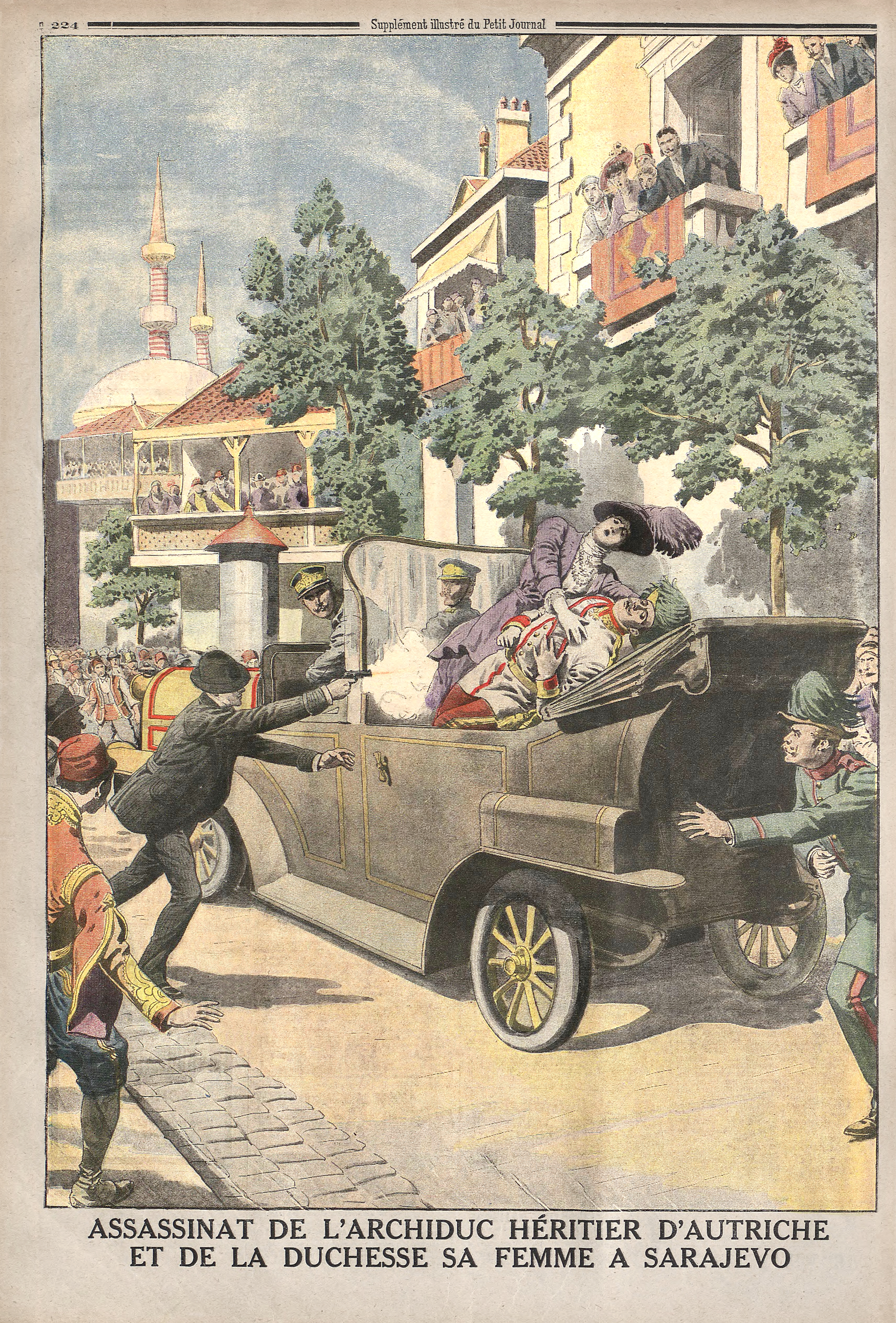
The assassination of Franz Ferdinand prompted Austro-Hungarian leaders to take a firm stance against Serbia.

On June 24th, 1914, four days before the Sarajevo attack, the dual monarchy, shaken by the outcome of the Balkan wars, while "quietly slipping away", (Note: In the words of Paul Kennedy.) had drawn up its plan of action for a renewed active policy in the Balkans, directed against its ambitious and restless Serbian neighbor.

Thus, in the weeks leading up to the attack, the most hostile Austro-Hungarian diplomats and military officers multiplied the opportunities to express this animosity, lying in wait for the slightest opportunity to crush the kingdom of Belgrade politically and militarily. Franz Conrad von Hötzendorf, chief of staff of the Austro-Hungarian army, described to Heinrich von Tschirschky, the German ambassador in Vienna at the time, a catastrophic situation for the dual monarchy, undermined by Russian and Serbian propaganda aimed at the Slavic monarchy.

Against this backdrop, the joint war minister, the warmonger Alexander von Krobatin, noted a deterioration in the dual monarchy's position on the Balkan peninsula. The assassination of the Kronprinz provided Austro-Hungarian diplomats with the opportunity to attempt to reverse this trend, which was causing Austria-Hungary to lose influence and prestige. According to the close advisors of Leopold Berchtold, then Austro-Hungarian Foreign Minister, this attempt to steer international relations in a direction once again favorable to the dual monarchy was to be the result of swift action.

The assassination of Franz Joseph's heir shook Europe but did not destabilize it. Those in charge of the dual monarchy were divided in the wake of the assassination: Austria's Germans and Hungary's Magyars were satisfied with the death of the heir to the throne, who was an ardent advocate of reorganizing the dual monarchy by adding a South Slavic division to the two existing Austrian and Hungarian divisions; the Emperor and King, for his part, expressed no grief at the news of the assassination attempt on his heir, who was at the time the first opponent of his cautious policy on the international stage.

Franz Joseph, who was unaffected by the death of his heir, nonetheless advocated action to restore the prestige of the dynasty, which had been damaged by the attack. The emperor analyzed the attack as an affront to the honor of the monarchy and the ruling family. Advised by Leopold Berchtold's warmongering deputies, the old monarch initially wished both to support the dual monarchy's position with evidence of the Serbian government's involvement, and to secure the support of the Reich, Austria-Hungary's main ally, as part of a concerted action.

=== The Reich in July 1914 ===
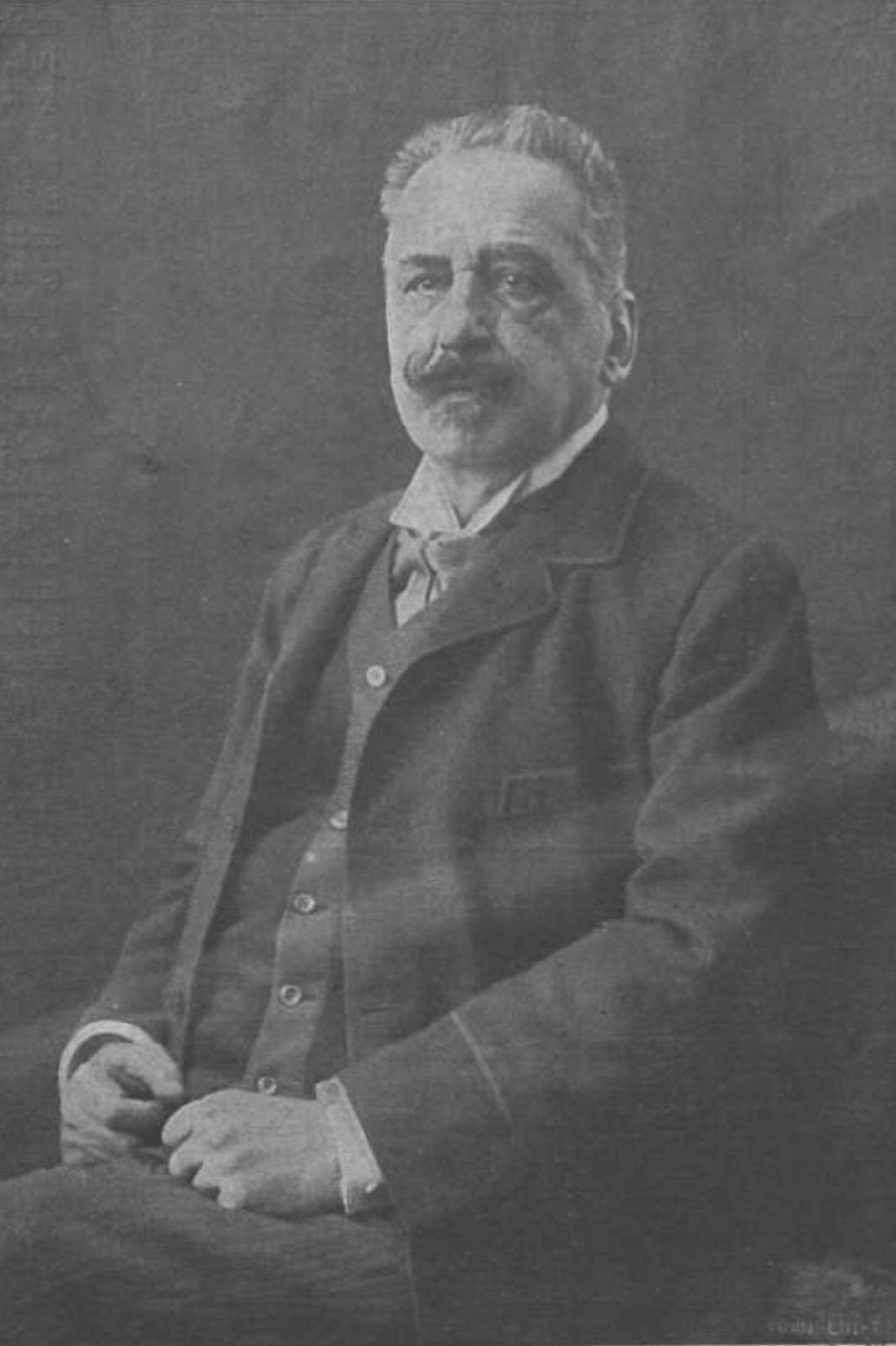
Ladislaus de Szögyény-Marich, Austro-Hungarian ambassador in Berlin, was quickly informed of the Auswärtiges Amt's position in the current crisis.

In the days following the assassination attempt on the Imperial and Royal Kronprinz, the Reich's political leaders sent their Austro-Hungarian allies mixed signals.

The German ambassador in Vienna, for example, repeatedly called for caution, echoing the position of Wilhelm II, who at the time had reservations about military action against Serbia. Similarly, Arthur Zimmermann, the Under-Secretary of State for Foreign Affairs, called for moderation through László Szőgyény-Marich Jr., the Austro-Hungarian ambassador in Berlin, as he did not wish to see Vienna impose humiliating conditions on Belgrade.

Opposing these calls for caution, German nationalist circles, often close to the Emperor, defended a firm attitude towards Serbia. In this way, Reich officials called into question the advice they had previously given to their Austro-Hungarian counterparts: indeed, until late 1913, German diplomats advised their interlocutors in the dual monarchy to conciliate Serbian leaders by means of bribes or bilateral cooperation programs. Wilhelm II adopted these bellicose positions, mainly in the remarks he made on the reports of his ministers and their subordinates, expressing his hostility to Heinrich von Tschirschky's moderation as early as June 30th, and his desire to "annihilate Serbia" on July 2nd.

These bellicose positions were also dictated by the Reich's weakening position on the international stage. Indeed, since the end of the Second Balkan War, it appeared that the last German positions in the Balkans and the Ottoman Empire were being challenged by the active Russian and French policy of replenishing Ottoman, Romanian and Serbian finances, depleted by the war that had just ended: At the same time, Ottoman loans to finance the extension of the Bagdadbahn were successfully placed on the Paris and London financial hubs. This Franco-Russian financing allowed diplomats to anticipate the end of the alliance between these countries on the one hand, with the Reich and the dual monarchy on the other.

Faced with this situation, the German and Austro-Hungarian allies wished to coordinate their actions, resume a policy of indirect control of the Balkans and the Ottoman Empire, and show unity in their response to the attack. On July 2nd, Wilhelm II informed Franz Joseph that the Reich was prepared to support the dual monarchy in the current crisis. The presence of Wilhelm II at the Kronprinz funeral would have provided an opportunity for a meeting between the two emperors, but the sudden cancellation of his visit forced the two allies to use other means of communication to synchronize their actions.

== Assigned objectives ==
By sending his chief of cabinet to Berlin, Leopold Berchtold pursued two complementary objectives: the first was to secure German support, while the second was to obtain the approval of the Hungarian Prime Minister, Istvan Tisza, which was conditional on German support. Finally, the dispatch of one of the minister's closest diplomats was also intended to enable the two monarchs to hold talks, originally planned for the German emperor's visit to the funeral of the assassinated archduke.

=== German support ===
Unable to engage with the dual monarchy, or even to take an initiative against Serbia without the support of the Reich, the Austro-Hungarian leadership was quick to ascertain the German position in the current crisis. They were well aware of their country's inability to wage war against Russian-backed Serbia on its own.

Immediately after the assassination attempt on the Austro-Hungarian Kronprinz, the leaders of the dual monarchy, spurred on by the demands of Hungarian Prime Minister Istvan Tisza, who feared international consequences in the event of an Austro-Serbian war, sought German support, or at least clarification of the Reich's position regarding the crisis sparked by the Sarajevo assassination. Indeed, power imbalance within the Triplice put the dual monarchy's political independence from the Reich into perspective, prompting Paul Kennedy to define this independence as "artificial".

Among the complications encountered by István Tisza, stationed in Transylvania, the balance of power in the Balkans was tipping to the detriment of the Dual Monarchy. Indeed, Franco-Russian policy, embodied by Tsar Nicholas II's visit to Constantza, led Ottokar Czernin, then Austro-Hungarian ambassador in Bucharest, to consider the alliance with Romania a "dead thing". Tisza was thus in favor of neutralizing Romania, either through a German-Romanian alliance, or an Austro-Hungarian-Bulgarian reverse alliance.

In this rather unfavorable context, Wilhelm II and his ministers evaded all specific questions raised by Austro-Hungarian politicians until July 1st, a situation that was not overlooked by the Hungarian Prime Minister. (Note: He states this in his report to Franz Josef dated July 1st, 1914.) So, while Wilhelm II and members of the imperial government remained evasive, Count Berchtold nonetheless obtained assurances from the German ambassador in Vienna, Heinrich von Tschirschky, a personal friend of Alexander Hoyos, that the German government would support the dual monarchy in the current crisis. Nevertheless, the Austro-Hungarians could not determine whether the ambassador was expressing his own position or that of the Reich government. Faced with this uncertainty, and not wishing to commit the Dual Monarchy to a confrontation with Serbia and Russia on its own, the Austro-Hungarian Crown Council decided to send a mission to Berlin, tasked with defending a firm policy in the crisis opened by the assassination of the Austro-Hungarian Kronprinz and obtaining German support.

Sending this plenipotentiary was above all tactical. In fact, in 1913, German diplomats had held back the dual monarchy, urging it to prefer diplomatic successes to uncertain military adventures. However, a few months later, in July 1914, the Reich was seeking to "encourage" its main ally, by urging Austro-Hungarian officials to take decisive and forceful action against Serbia.

=== Consensus within the dual monarchy ===
Following the news of the attack, Austro-Hungarian officials were divided into two groups on the policy to be adopted: while the majority favored action against Serbia, the Hungarian Prime Minister, István Tisza, and those close to him preferred to settle for diplomatic success.

The Emperor, as guardian of the institutions, wanted agreement between the main Austrian and Hungarian political leaders before any initiative was taken by the dual monarchy. On June 30th, the joint Foreign Minister met Istvan Tisza, who conditioned his agreement to military action on the support of Germany; the Hungarian feared Russian intervention concerning the crisis opened up by the attack, just as he feared Romanian intervention in Transylvania.

However, while most of the dual monarchy's political and military leaders were keen to take action against Serbia, the military, particularly Franz Conrad von Hötzendorf, were convinced that such action would be impossible without the support of the Reich; aware of the possibility of Russian armed intervention in the crisis, they knew that the common army was incapable of facing a war on two fronts on its own: in the Balkans, against Serbia and its Montenegrin ally, and in Galicia, against Russia. As an advocate of determination during the last Austro-Serbian crisis in the autumn of 1913, Conrad hoped to obtain the support of the Reich in resolving the crisis that had opened on June 28th, 1914.

== Hoyos in Berlin ==
Alexander Hoyos was dispatched to Berlin, carrying several documents to be handed over to his German counterparts. He arrived in Berlin on the morning of July 5th, carrying a voluminous dossier intended to enlighten the Reich on the political perspective of the dual monarchy.

=== Documents and instructions ===
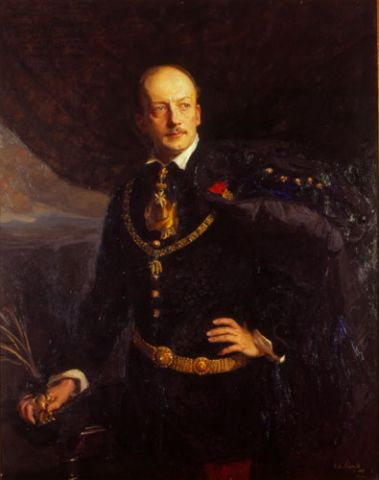
Leopold Berchtold gave his collaborator precise instructions.

Count Hoyos, a high-ranking Austro-Hungarian official, and diplomat, was to meet with the German emperor and his principal advisors to discuss the course of action to be taken.

For these discussions, he had at his disposal a personal letter from Franz Joseph, to be delivered to Wilhelm II by the Austro-Hungarian ambassador in Berlin, Ladislaus de Szögyény-Marich. In this letter, Franz Joseph lashed out violently at the Russian policy: Russia's actions, relayed locally by the Serbs, were aimed solely at destroying the dual monarchy, according to the Emperor and King. He also accused the Serbian royal government of having played a key role in the June 28th attack.

Expanding on this autograph letter, Alexander Hoyos handed the German emperor a voluminous "aide-memoire" containing the terms of the report sent to Berchtold by Baron Franz Matscheko. In this preliminary report, (Note: Franz Matscheko's report gives an overview of the situation of the dual monarchy since the end of the Balkan Wars, and suggests a change of direction in Austria-Hungary's Balkan policy.) Baron Matscheko suggested to Minister Berchtold that the dual monarchy's policy should be directed towards Bulgaria, as this alliance was aimed at the Kingdom of Belgrade.

The updated Matscheko report, (Note: The update concerns the consequences of Romania's change of alliance, perceptible since May 1914.) submitted to Leopold Berchtold on June 24th, provided the latter, with Franz Josef's approval, with an opportunity to communicate the Austro-Hungarian view of Bulgaria's defeat in the Balkan wars to the Reich: for the Austro-Hungarian editors of this letter to Wilhelm II and the "aide-mémoire", Serbia was primarily responsible for destabilizing the dual monarchy, through its "Panslavist" propaganda.

Highlighting the Viennese diplomats' focus on the question of the South Slavs, the documents sent to Berlin, the report of June 24th, 1914, and its appendix written after the attack, give more the impression of a text written in haste and a certain improvisation, setting out facts without putting them into perspective with one another, evoking, for example, Romania's recent change of alliance. Thus, on the basis of these analyses, the leaders of the Dual Monarchy, represented in Berlin by Alexander Hoyos, one of the most hawkish of Berchtold's teams, proposed to isolate and demean the Kingdom of Belgrade for many years to come, while assuring the Reich of their willingness to engage in armed confrontation with Serbia.

=== Formal and informal exchanges ===
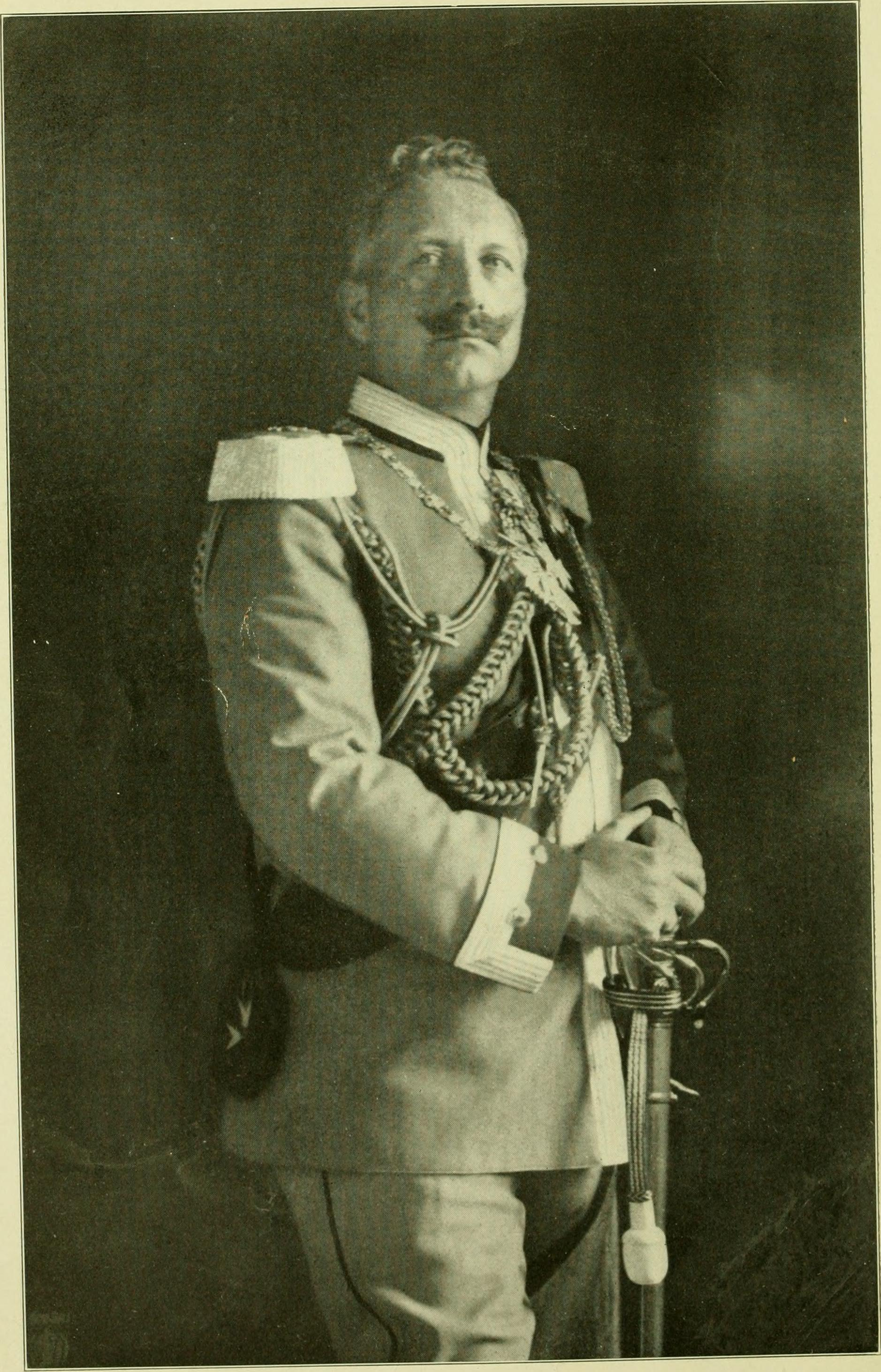
Wilhelm II received Count Hoyos on July 5th, 1914.

Once in Berlin, Hoyos, an advocate for the use of force against Serbia, held talks not only with German officials, but also with representatives of the Reich press, notably the publicist Friedrich Naumann, who was also in favor of a belligerent German policy. During the meeting with this close associate of the German General Staff, the position of the military was discussed at length: in their eyes, Russia's military build-up was progressively downgrading the military resources of the Reich and its allies, ultimately depriving them of any initiative against the Russians.

Austrian-Hungarian Ambassador Szőgyény was received for lunch by Wilhelm II at the Neue Palais in Potsdam on July 5th. Subsequently, Hoyos met Arthur Zimmermann, the Reich's Under-Secretary of State for Foreign Affairs, a supporter of retaliatory action against Serbia. After receiving the documents from Hoyos, the German monarch summoned not only the Reich's acting military leaders, but also his ministers, who were in Berlin (Note: Gottlieb von Jagow, German Secretary of State, Helmuth von Moltke the Younger, German Chief of Staff, and Alfred von Tirpitz, Commander of the Navy, were on leave.) at the time. Wilhelm II's first consultation brought together Erich von Falkenhayn, the Prussian War Minister, Hans von Plessen, aide-de-camp to the German Emperor, and Moritz von Lyncker, head of the military cabinet, while the second meeting chaired by the Emperor brought together the Reich's political leaders, Chancellor Theobald von Bethmann-Hollweg, his Under-Secretary of State Arthur Zimmermann and Minister Erich von Falkenhayn. No records were kept of these meetings. Questioned in 1920 by the Reichstag parliamentary committee of inquiry, Bethmann-Hollweg, Falkenhayn and von Plessen all insisted on their emperor's readiness to act as quickly as possible against Serbia, as Wilhelm II wished to "get it over with as soon as possible", as he noted in the margin of a telegram from the German ambassador in Vienna, Heinrich von Tschirschky.

Alongside these official meetings, the Austro-Hungarian representative met Viktor Naumann, a publicist, and confidant of the Reich Foreign Minister and Bavarian Council President Georg von Hertling. Viktor Naumann reiterated the conclusions of the discussions he had had with Hoyos on July 1st in Vienna; during this private conversation, (Note: Naumann repeatedly reminds his interlocutor of the informal nature of the meeting.) Naumann insisted on the support the Reich must not spare for the dual monarchy: without formulating it so clearly, he informed his interlocutor that Austria-Hungary would benefit from the support of the Reich in the event of open conflict with Belgrade.

== Outcome ==
On the basis of an over-optimistic assessment of the situation, German officials encouraged their ally to take a hard line against the kingdom of Belgrade.

=== The blank cheque ===
By July 5th, the two Austro-Hungarian diplomats Alexander Hoyos and Ladislaus de Szögyény-Marich were assured of the Reich's support for the dual monarchy, its only truly loyal ally. This decision was first taken by Wilhelm II at the luncheon he shared with the two Austro-Hungarian representatives, then confirmed in the afternoon at the informal meeting between the German Emperor, the Reich Chancellor, and the Under-Secretary of State in Potsdam. Ladislaus de Szögyény-Marich soon reported back to Vienna on the German decision, based on the assumption that Russia would remain silent in the face of German-Austro-Hungarian initiatives.

German support, confirmed to the Austro-Hungarians by the Reich Chancellor the very next day, had nevertheless left the dual monarchy in complete control of the actions it intended to take against Serbia. Moreover, the nature of German support for the Dual Monarchy was not specified by Alexander Hoyos' interlocutors. (Note: At this stage of the crisis, Hoyos's German interlocutors could not envisage anything other than diplomatic support for Austria-Hungary and pressure on Russia and its allies.)

=== Austro-Hungarian negotiations ===
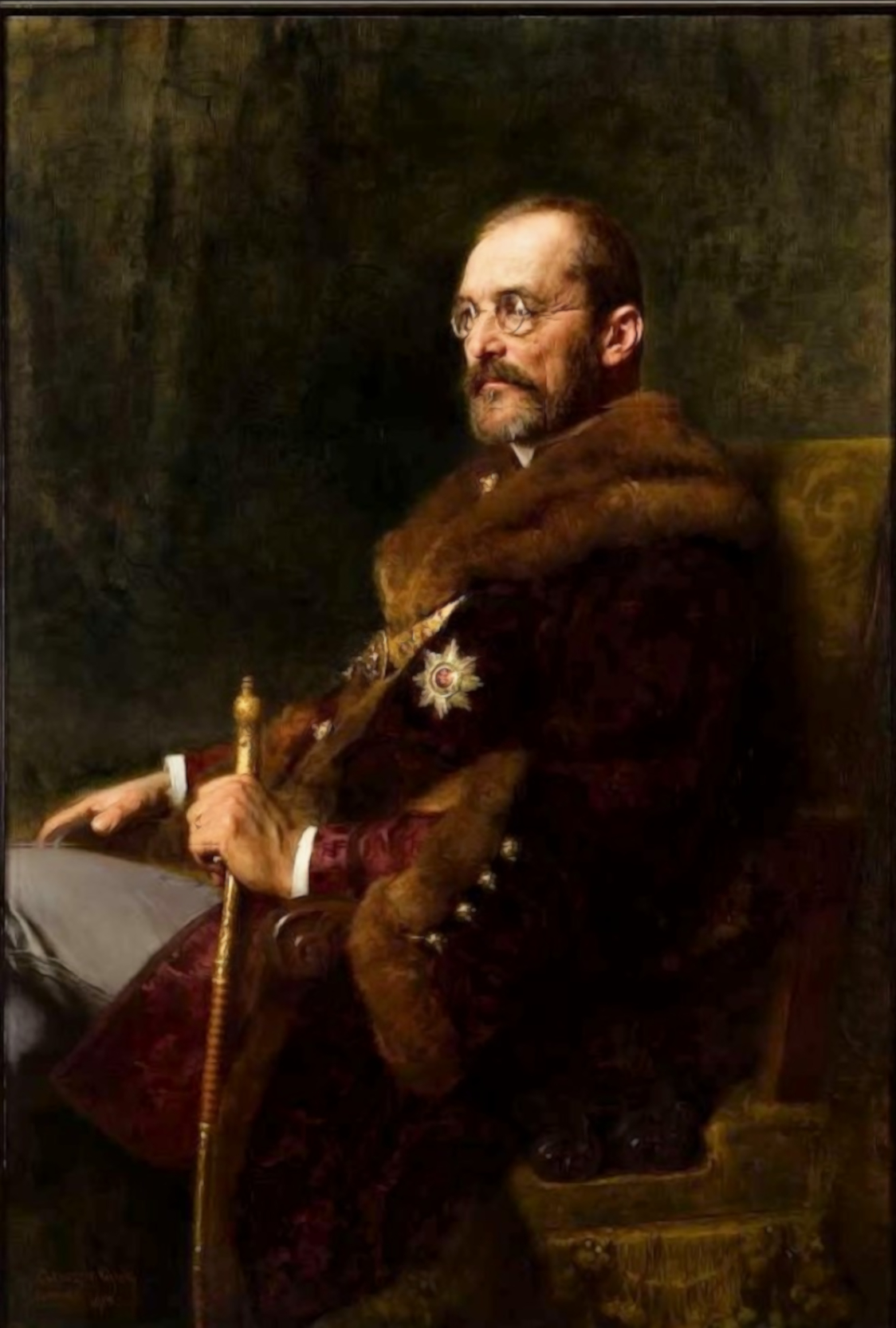
Hungarian Prime Minister Istvan Tisza is the most hostile among the leaders of the dual monarchy to a bellicose initiative without German support.

When Alexander Hoyos returned to Vienna on the evening of July 6th, the results of his mission were immediately known, and Austro-Hungarian officials began to discuss the matter, mainly with the aim of convincing Istvan Tisza, then Hungarian Prime Minister, that military action against Serbia was necessary. It was not until mid-July that Stephan Burián von Rajecz, former governor of Bosnia-Herzegovina and a close friend of Istvan Tisza, succeeded. (Note: In the eyes of the dual monarchy's military leaders, belligerent action against Serbia was the only way to avoid a further loss of prestige for the Habsburg monarchy in the Balkans.) However, the Hungarian Prime Minister managed to force his interlocutors to send a note before any military action was taken against Belgrade.

Indeed, Istvan Tisza, representing Hungarian interests, was opposed both to any large-scale territorial expansion by the dual monarchy and to any initiative that would make Austria-Hungary the aggressor. His hostility to any territorial expansion at Serbia's expense was based on his rejection of the political consequences of incorporating new Slavic populations, in other words, an increase in the weight of their representatives in Austrian and Hungarian representative bodies.

=== The July 23rd ultimatum ===
During the afternoon meeting of the Austro-Hungarian Crown Council on July 7th, the Austro-Hungarian Foreign Minister, Leopold Berchtold, officially informed the Emperor, the Austrian and Hungarian Council Presidents, Karl von Stürgkh and István Tisza, and his colleagues in charge of joint affairs, Alexander von Krobatin and Leon Biliński, of Germany's support for the warlike policy he intended to pursue against Belgrade.

This news swept away the last Austro-Hungarian hesitations, but did not convince the Hungarian Prime Minister, Istvan Tisza, who was still hostile to any military initiative against Serbia at the time. (Note: Tisza changed his position on July 14th and accepted the idea of sending Belgrade an ultimatum.)

== See also ==
- Causes of World War I
- Assassination of Archduke Franz Ferdinand
- July Crisis
- Blank cheque
- July Ultimatum
- History of Austria-Hungary during World War I
- German Empire
- Leopold Berchtold
- Alexander, Count of Hoyos
- István Tisza
