= Alexander Graf von Hoyos =

Austro-Hungarian diplomat (1876-1937)

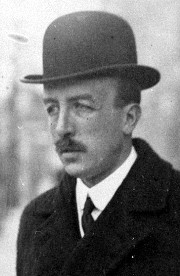

Austro-Hungarian Minister to Norway
- In office 14 February 1917 – 2 November 1918
- Preceded by: None
- Succeeded by: None

Chef de Cabinet of the Imperial Foreign Minister
- In office 22 April 1912 – 4 January 1917
- Preceded by: Count Friedrich von Szapáry
- Succeeded by: None

Personal details
- Born: Ludwig Alexander Georg von Hoyos; 13 May 1876 Fiume, Austria-Hungary (now Croatia)
- Died: 20 October 1937 (aged 61) Schwertberg, Austria
- Spouse: Edmée de Loys-Chandieu (m. 1913; died 1937)
- Relations: Robert Whitehead (grandfather)
- Parent(s): Georg Anton von Hoyos; Alice Whitehead

Ludwig Alexander Georg Graf von Hoyos, Freiherr zu Stichsenstein (13 May 1876 – 20 October 1937) was an Austro-Hungarian diplomat who played a major role during the July Crisis while serving as chef de cabinet of the Foreign Minister at the outbreak of World War I in 1914. He was the last chef de cabinet of Austria-Hungary. He was the grandson of Robert Whitehead, the inventor of the torpedo.

== Early life ==
Hoyos was born in Fiume (then part of Austria-Hungary, now called Rijeka in Croatia) on 13 May 1876 into the House of Hoyos, a noble family that hailed originally from Spain, but which had migrated to Austria around 1525. Over the centuries, the family had become part of the Hungarian nobility.

His parents were Georg Anton, Count of Hoyos (1842–1904), and Alice Whitehead, who was the daughter of Robert Whitehead, the British-Austrian engineer and inventor of the torpedo. They had married in 1869, and Georg Hoyos had been in charge of the Whitehead shipyard in Fiume at the time. One of his sisters, Marguerite (1871–1945), was married to Herbert von Bismarck, the eldest son of Chancellor Otto von Bismarck.

== Career ==
Following an expedition to China with his uncle, who served as British chargé d'affaires in Tokyo, in 1900 Hoyos started his diplomatic career as a provisional attaché at the Austro-Hungarian legation in Peking. Then followed postings as attaché in Paris, Belgrade, and Berlin, and from 1905 he was a counsellor, first at the legation in Stuttgart, then at the embassy in London.

During the Bosnian crisis of 1908, Hoyos was sent on a mission to Berlin to lobby for German support for the Austrian annexation of Bosnia, and he became an ardent supporter of Count Lexa von Aehrenthal's activist foreign policy.

In April 1912, Hoyos was appointed to serve as chef de cabinet to the Imperial Foreign Minister Count Berchtold, a post that had considerably gained significance under his predecessor Count Szapáry. Hoyos quickly became an influential adviser to Berchtold and the leader of a group of young diplomats at the Ballhausplatz, referred to as the 'Young Rebels', who favoured a more aggressive foreign policy as the only means to stop the decline of the Dual Monarchy and avoid its disintegration. This policy line would prove fatal during the summer of 1914.

=== July Crisis ===
As chef de cabinet, Hoyos was at the centre of decision-making at Ballhausplatz, following the assassination of Archduke Franz Ferdinand in Sarajevo on 28 June 1914. Together with Count Forgách, who served as Second Section Chief and was another prominent member of the Young Rebels, he quickly became one of the most vocal pro-war diplomats during the ensuing July Crisis.

It was Viktor Naumann, a Berlin journalist's idea to contact a junior Ballplatz official in Vienna on 1 July 1914. Hoyos had been sent to Berlin 1908-9 to win German approval of the annexation of Bosnia. Naumann was well-connected, enticing Hoyos to believe he could influence the Wilhelmstrasse. He was told of Germany's diplomatic prowess convinced that Britain would not intervene in his mission. So he was surprised to learn Germany found "the necessity of taking action against Serbia", but this was not confirmed by an absent Secretary of State. Hoyos quickly advocated a firm, tough and confrontational approach putting himself at Berchtold's disposal. During the ensuing days a general consensus of war with Serbia was achieved in Vienna, where Conrad expected the Kaiser's backing. Before the assassination, a memorandum calling for a more aggressive foreign policy in the Balkans had been prepared in the Ballplatz. This one was now revised under the Hoyos guidance towards counselling a military solution. In addition, a letter from Emperor Franz Joseph I to the Kaiser in the same spirit was drafted.

In order to ascertain the position of its ally Berchtold decided on 4 July to send his chef de cabinet to Berlin to bypass the Ambassador at Berlin Count Szögyény-Marich, whom he considered "too aged and unimaginative for such an important task". The following day, a Sunday morning Hoyos arrived in Berlin with the memorandum and the Emperor's letter to secure Szogyeny's support. While Szögyény-Marich met the Kaiser for lunch at Potsdam, Hoyos met the Under Secretary of State Zimmermann (as Secretary of State Gottlieb von Jagow had just married and was away on his honeymoon). In the evening, Szögyény-Marich cabled about the Kaiser's pledge of "full German backing". Hoyos had received a similar message from Zimmermann during his meeting. The following day the two diplomats met with Chancellor Theobald von Bethmann Hollweg and Zimmermann, and the Kaiser's commitments were confirmed. Austria-Hungary had thus received the famous "blank cheque" for dealing with Serbia. Upon his return to Vienna on 7 July, Hoyos reported back to the Ballplatz with Bethmann Hollweg's oral promise of support. He acted as secretary during the meeting of the Common Ministerial Council the same day as well as on 19 July, when agreement was found on the last details about the note to Serbia.

While it is beyond doubt that Hoyos and others in the Austro-Hungarian leadership not only foresaw but wanted war during the July Crisis, it has, however, been much debated among historians as to whether they fully understood the scale of such a war. Some have argued that they considered a Russian intervention as unlikely and that the intention was a limited war, known as localisation between Serbia and Austria. While others have pointed to numerous remarks made during the course of July that undertaking action against Serbia would lead to a European war. It is reasoned that Russian intervention was not taken into much consideration. One can, for example, find little if any records of the issue being discussed in the minutes that Hoyos wrote from the two meetings of the Common Imperial Ministerial Council in July. However, on the 16 July 1914, Friedrich von Pourtalès, the German Ambassador in St. Petersburg, falsely told the Russian Foreign Minister, Sergey Sazonov, that Austria was not planning on any measure that might cause a war in the Balkans, so no Russian complaints were made. This in itself undermined the rationale that Austro-Hungary did not consider that a world war was impossible. In fact, by deliberately misrepresenting the existence and planning of a presentation to Serbia of an ultimatum containing “unacceptable demands”, the Austro-Hungary state implicitly knew that a world war would be inevitable, hence the deception during the July Crisis (See 'Contents':- 6 Preparations for the Austro-Hungarian ultimatum).

=== First World War ===
After the war had begun, Hoyos was relegated to a minor role, but he remained as chef de cabinet until January 1917, when he was demoted to serve in Norway as minister at the newly opened legation at Christiania (now Oslo). After the fall of the Habsburg empire, Hoyos retired from public service.

== Personal life ==
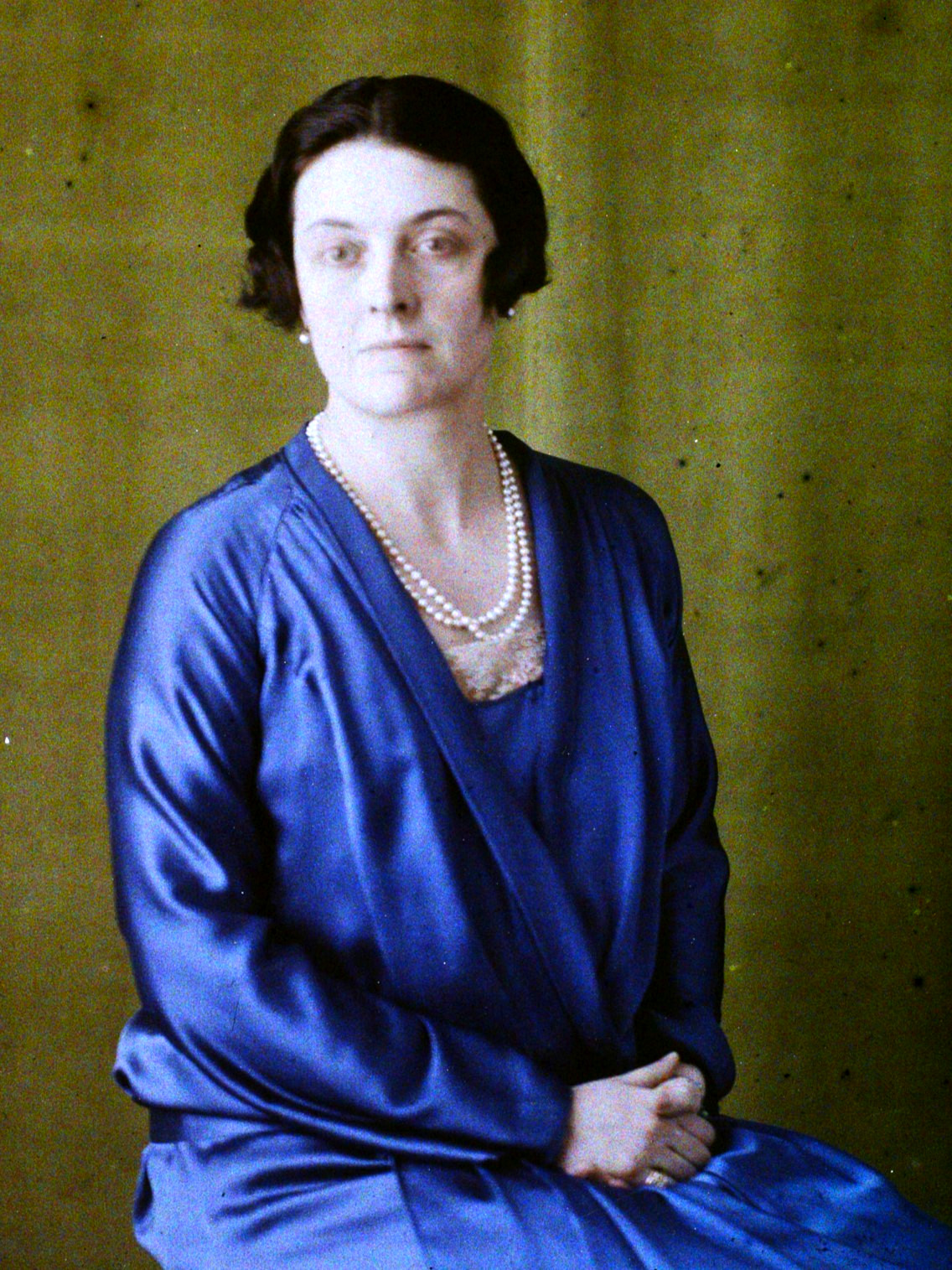
Hoyos' wife, Edmée, in a 1928 Autochrome by Georges Chevalier

On 24 April 1913, in Paris, Hoyos married Edmée de Loys-Chandieu (1892–1945), the daughter of Henri, Marquis de Loys-Chandieu and the former Agnès de Pourtalès. Her maternal grandparents were Comtesse Mélanie de Pourtalès, a Lady-in-waiting to Empress Eugénie (the wife of Napoleon III) and Count Edmond de Pourtalès (a son of the Swiss banker and art collector Count James-Alexandre de Pourtalès). The couple had three children, including:

- Johann Georg von Hoyos (1914–1998), who married Helga von Amann in 1939.
- Mélanie von Hoyos (1916–1949), who married Count Gottfried von Bismarck-Schönhausen, also a member of the Bismarck family, in 1937.
- Alice von Hoyos (1918-2007), who in 1955 married actor Friedrich von Ledebur, who was divorced from Iris Tree.

Hoyos died in Schwertberg on 20 October 1937.

=== Descendants ===
Through his daughter Mélanie, he was a grandfather of Countess Vendeline von Bismarck-Schönhausen, Countess Barbara von Bismarck-Schönhausen, Count Andreas von Bismarck-Schönhausen, and his descendants include Stephanie zu Guttenberg.

== Works ==
- Der deutsch-englische Gegensatz und sein Einfluß auf die Balkanpolitik Österreich-Ungarns (Berlin, Verlag de Gryter, 1922)
- Weltenwende. Ein Vorschlag zur Lösung der Weltkrise (Vienna, Verlag Jung Österreich, 1931)

Diplomatic posts
Preceded by Friedrich Graf Szapáry von Muraszombath, Széchysziget und Szapár	Chef de cabinet of the Imperial Foreign Minister; 1912–1917	Succeeded by None
Preceded by None	Austro-Hungarian Minister to Norway; 1917–1918	Succeeded by None
