= László Szapáry =

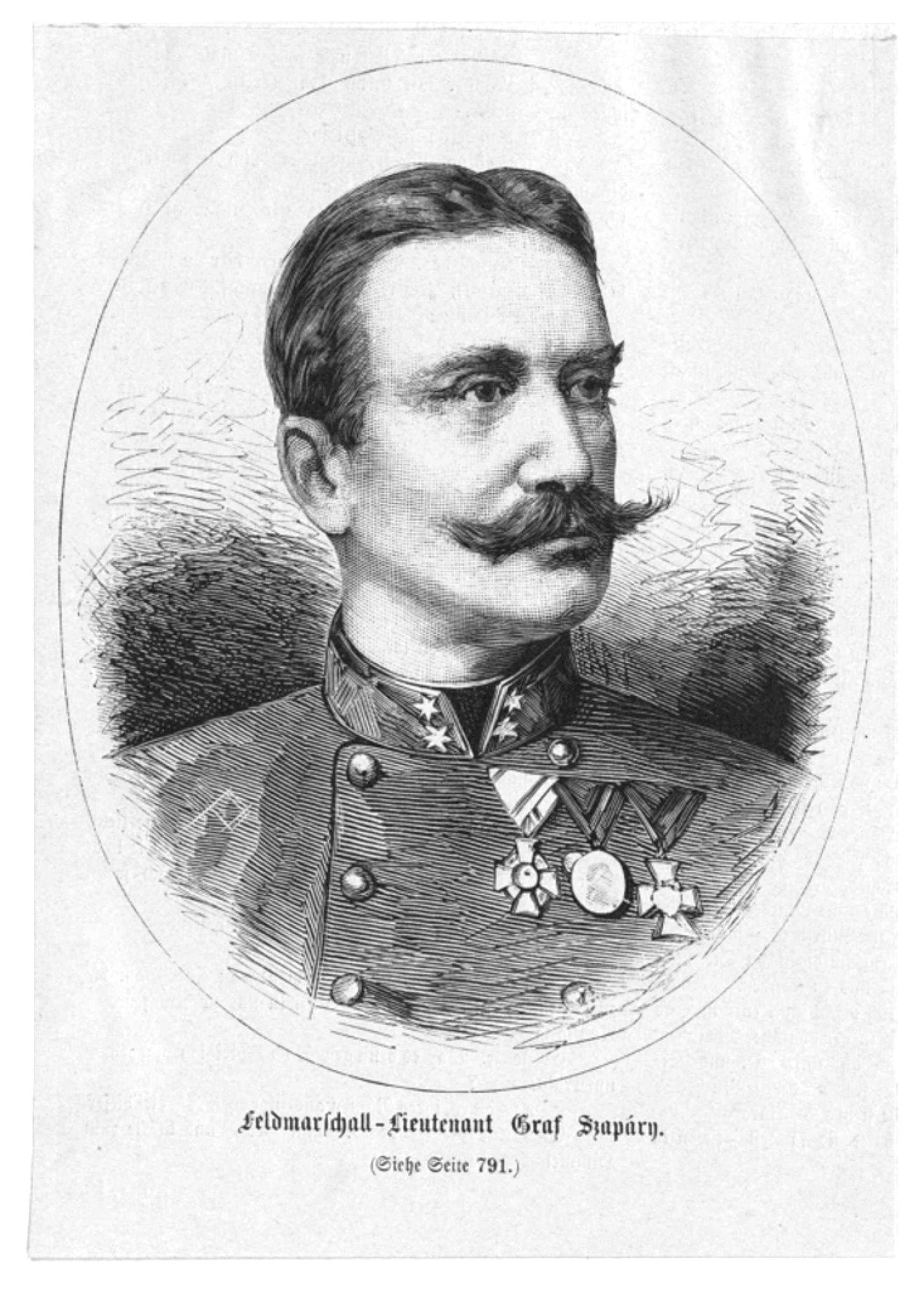
- Born: 22 November 1831; Pest, Hungary
- Died: 28 September 1883 (aged 51); Pozsony, Austria-Hungary (today: Bratislava, Slovakia)
- Military career
- Allegiance: Austrian Empire; Austria-Hungary
- Service years: 1848–1883
- Rank: Cavalry General
- Conflicts: Revolutions of 1848 in the Austrian Empire; Battle of Solferino; Austro-Hungarian occupation of Bosnia and Herzegovina
- Awards: Order of Maria Theresa

not to be confused with his grandson Laszlo Szapáry.

Count László Szapáry de Szapár, Muraszombat et Széchy-Sziget (22 November 1831 – 28 September 1883) was a Hungarian nobleman and a general of the Austrian Imperial Army.

== Early life ==
Born into the prominent Hungarian House of Szapáry, he was the fourth son of Count Ferenc Szapáry de Muraszombath, Széchysziget et Szapár (1804-1875) and his wife, Countess Rozália Almásy de Zsadány et Török-Szent-Miklós (1806-1887).

== Biography ==
He entered in service during the 1848 revolutions when he fought in Italy. Later he also participated in the Second Italian War of Independence, particularly in the Battle of Solferino. Szapáry played a leading role in the Austro-Hungarian occupation of Bosnia and Herzegovina in 1878.

Szapáry was also a capable horseman, taking part in the 1868 Grand National, becoming the first of his nationality to do so. Riding Büszke he was outpaced on the second circuit and pulled up at Valentine's Brook.

== Personal life ==
On 28 April 1862, he married Countess Marianne von Grünne (1835-1906), daughter of Count Karl Ludwig von Grünne and his wife, Countess Caroline of Trauttmansdorff-Weinsberg (1808-1886), granddaughter of Prince Ferdinand von Trauttmansdorff-Weinsberg. Together they had four children:

- Count Károly István László Szapáry (1864-1878)
- Countess Ferdinándina Szapáry (1867-1892); unmarried
- Count Frigyes Szapáry (1869-1935)
- Countess Ilona Szapáry (1877-1884)
