= Stephanie von Bismarck-Schönhausen =

German activist, public speaker, entrepreneur and author

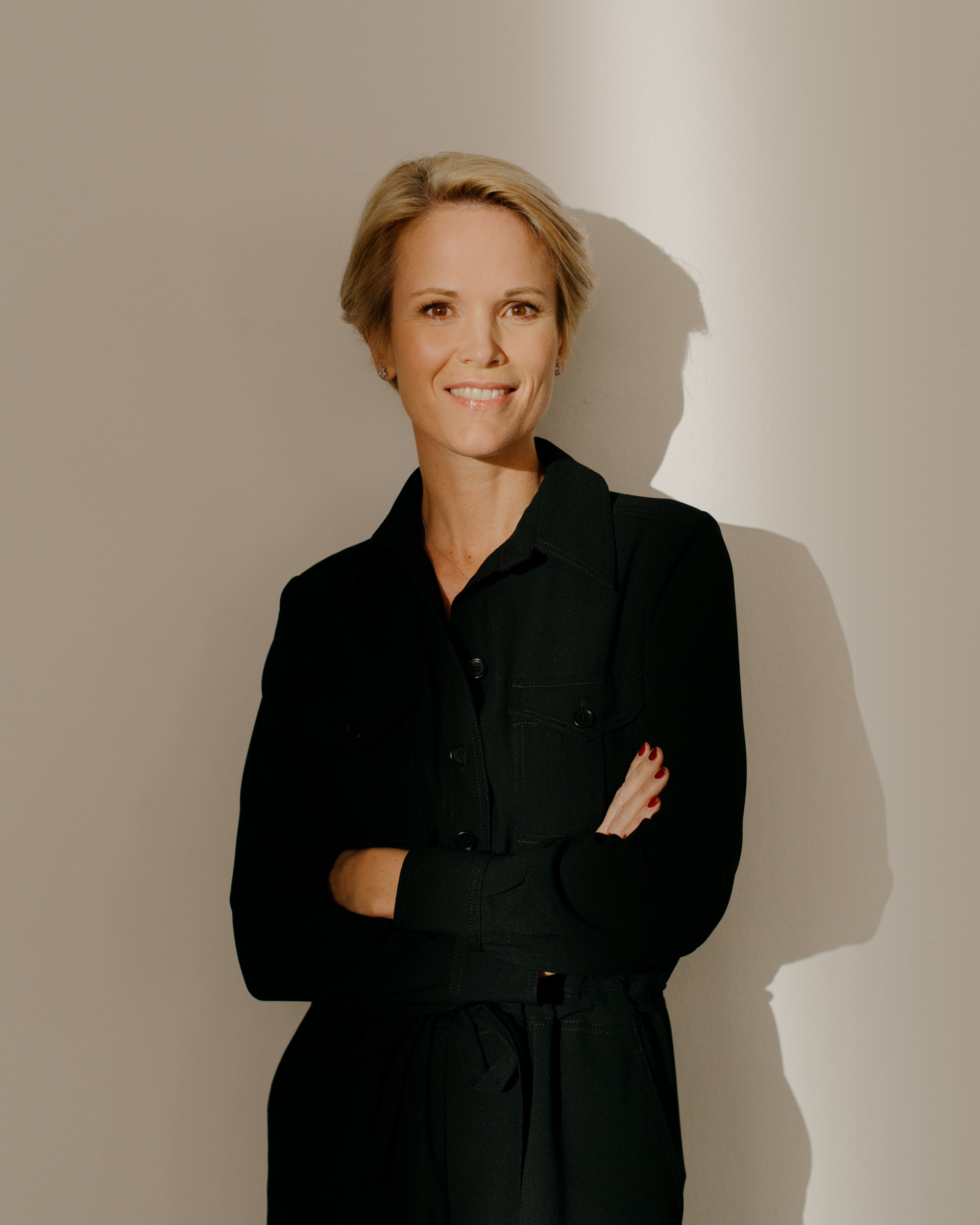
- Stephanie von Bismarck-Schönhausen in 2021
- Born: Stephanie Anna Charlotte Gräfin von Bismarck-Schönhausen; 24 November 1976 (age 49); Munich, Bavaria, West Germany
- Spouse: Karl-Theodor zu Guttenberg (m. 2000; sep. 2023)
- Children: 2
- Relatives: House of Bismarck (by birth); House of Guttenberg (formerly, by marriage)

Stephanie Anna Charlotte Gräfin von Bismarck-Schönhausen (former Buhl-Freifrau von und zu Guttenberg; 24 November 1976 in Munich) is a German activist, host of podcast 'How Do We Manage?', public speaker, entrepreneur and author in the field of child abuse and internet education for children and adolescents. She was the former president of the German section of Innocence in Danger and was married to the former German Minister of Defence, Karl-Theodor zu Guttenberg since 2000 until they separated in 2023.

== Background ==
Born in Munich, Stephanie von Bismarck-Schönhausen is the only child and daughter of Andreas Herbert Alexander Graf von Bismarck-Schönhausen (Berlin, Province of Brandenburg, Free State of Prussia, 14 February 1941) by his second wife (m. St. Moritz, 31 July 1975) Charlotte Kinberg (Stockholm, 24 September 1951), a Swedish interior architect with partial Dutch/German ancestry. A member of the Bismarck family, she is the great-great-granddaughter of Chancellor Otto, Prince of Bismarck, and great-granddaughter of Foreign Secretary Herbert, Prince of Bismarck. She is also a twice descendant of Robert Whitehead, the inventor of the torpedo, through her grandfather, the Austrian diplomat Alexander, Count of Hoyos. Through her grandmother Edmée de Loys-Chandieu (1892–1945), wife of Alexander Hoyos, she is a descendant of Swiss and Alsatian families, particularly the de Pourtalès family. She has two older half-sisters on her father's side.

Bismarck-Schönhausen grew up bilingual, and in addition to her native German and Swedish, she speaks English, French and Italian.

She attained a degree in textile engineering (Fashion Business Management) from the private academy Fachakademie für Textil & Schuhe in Nagold, and has worked for several textile companies in Cologne, Düsseldorf and Paris during her schooling.

On 12 February 2000 at Bad Reichenhall, she married Karl-Theodor zu Guttenberg, whom she had met when attending Love Parade in Berlin in 1995. They have two daughters, born in 2001 and 2002. Karl-Theodor zu Guttenberg resigned as German Minister of Defence due to the extensive plagiarism in his doctoral dissertation, and the whole family moved to the United States thereafter. After almost ten years in the United States, Bismarck-Schönhausen returned to Germany. In September 2023, it was revealed that Bismarck-Schönhausen and her husband had been separated since winter 2022–2023. Following the official finalization of the divorce in April 2025, Stephanie discontinued the use of the name zu Guttenberg and reverted to her birth name, Bismarck-Schönhausen.

== Podcast — 'How Do We Manage?' ==
In 2025, she launched the podcast 'How Do We Manage?'. The format sees Bismarck-Schönhausen interview a variety of thought leaders, campaigners, scientists, CEOs and activists, with a particular focus on how people can adapt and manage to the ever-changing world. The first series includes interviews with Dr. Paul Conti on managing mental health and trauma, Dr. Henning Beck on managing human integration with AI, and Elizabeth von der Goltz on remaining true to your values whilst achieving success.

The podcast was released on Apple Podcasts, Spotify, RSS and also available as a video podcast on YouTube.

== Activism ==
From 2009 until 2013, Bismarck-Schönhausen served as President of the German section of Innocence in Danger, an organisation combating child abuse, protecting the rights of children on the internet and working to restrict the distribution of child pornography. The organisation announced the end of her commitment on 18 February 2013. Ten days later, Bismarck-Schönhausen cited lack of personal presence due to her move to the United States as the reason.

In September 2010, she published the book Schaut nicht weg! Was wir gegen sexuellen Missbrauch tun müssen (lit. 'Don't look away! What we must do against sexual abuse'), co-written with Anne-Ev Ustorf. In this book, Bismarck-Schönhausen explains for example the difficulty a child has in confiding in their parents after abuse and the role of the internet in relation to acts of violence against children.

On 24 January 2011, Bismarck-Schönhausen became Patron of the Bavarian Deutsche Multiple Sklerose Gesellschaft.

Since January 2019, Bismarck-Schönhausen has been involved in several organisations in the fields of politics and education. From 2019 to 2023, she criticized the German education system in various interviews. Key points of her criticism included insufficient school equipment and the lack of media literacy education. She consequently called for widespread internet access along with computers or tablets equipped with up-to-date operating systems, as well as the introduction of media education as a core competency in schools. As part of her efforts to raise awareness about digitalization in schools, Bismarck-Schönhausen made several guest appearances on television and podcasts and published editorial articles.

== Public perception ==
When Bismarck-Schönhausen's then-husband, Karl-Theodor zu Guttenberg, assumed the position of a minister, media attention towards the couple increased. Until the plagiarism scandal involving Karl-Theodor zu Guttenberg, Bismarck-Schönhausen and her husband were often referred to in the press as the Kennedys of Germany due to their public presence, reminiscent of John F. Kennedy and his wife Jacqueline Kennedy. In October 2010, around 67% of all Germans stated that they would feel well represented by the Guttenbergs.

Bismarck-Schönhausen accompanied her husband when visiting troops in Afghanistan in December 2010, which drew some criticism from the media and opposition parties. Bismarck-Schönhausen's visit was defended by Andreas Schockenhoff, deputy leader of the CDU parliamentary group at the time, and Peter Altmaier, among others.

== Awards ==
- 2010: Goldene Erbse, by Märchenland – Deutsches Zentrum für Märchenkultur, during Berliner Märchentage.
- 2010: "Ehrenpreis für Kampf gegen Kindesmissbrauch", Deutscher Kinderpreis, World Vision Deutschland.
- 2011: Leading Ladies Award in the category "Social Engagement International", by the Austrian women's magazine Madonna.

== Publications ==
As author:

- Guttenberg, Stephanie zu; Ustorf, Anne-Ev (2010). Schaut nicht weg!, Freiburg im Breisgau: Kreuz. ISBN 978-3-7831-3485-8
- Guttenberg, Stephanie zu (2022). Wir können das besser! Erziehung, Bildung und Leben in der digitalen Realität. Kulmbach: Plassen. ISBN 978-3-8647-0864-0.

As publisher:

- Guttenberg, Stephanie zu; Fischer, Silke; Brownlees-Kaysen, Janice, erds. (2011). Die Märchen-Apotheke: Grimms Märchen als Heilmittel für Kinderseelen? (2nd edition, ed.). Munich: Kösel. ISBN 978-3-466-30926-9.

== Ancestry ==
Ancestors of Stephanie von Bismarck-Schönhausen

16. Otto, Prince of Bismarck (1815–1898)
8. Herbert, Prince of Bismarck (1849–1904)
17. Johanna von Puttkamer (1824–1894)
4. Count Gottfried von Bismarck-Schönhausen (1901–1949)
18. Count Georg von Hoyos (1842–1904)
9. Countess Marguerite von Hoyos (1871–1945)
19. Alice Whitehead
2. Count Andreas von Bismarck-Schönhausen (b. 1941)
20. Count Georg von Hoyos (1842–1904) (=18)
10. Count Alexander von Hoyos (1876–1937)
21. Alice Whitehead (=19)
5. Countess Melanie von Hoyos (1916–1947)
22. Henri, Marquis de Loys-Chandieu
11. Edmée de Loys-Chandieu (1892–1945)
23. Countess Agnès de Pourtalès
1. Countess Stephanie von Bismarck-Schönhausen (b. 1976)
24. Karl Johan Leonard Kinberg
12. Erik Waldemar Leonard Kinberg
25. Mathilde Sophia Torngren
6. Jan Pieter Oskar Kinberg (1922–1983)
26. Franz Joseph Leonhard Holzhaus
13. Julie Augusta Maria Holzhaus
27. Anna Caroline Emilie Adelheid Wehmann
3. Charlotte Margareta Kinberg (b. 1951)
14. Erik August Nitzelius (1887–1975)
7. Ulla Margareta Nitzelius (b. 1926)
15. Rut Valborg Cecilia Lindberg (1899–1981)
