= Szapáry =

Hungarian noble family

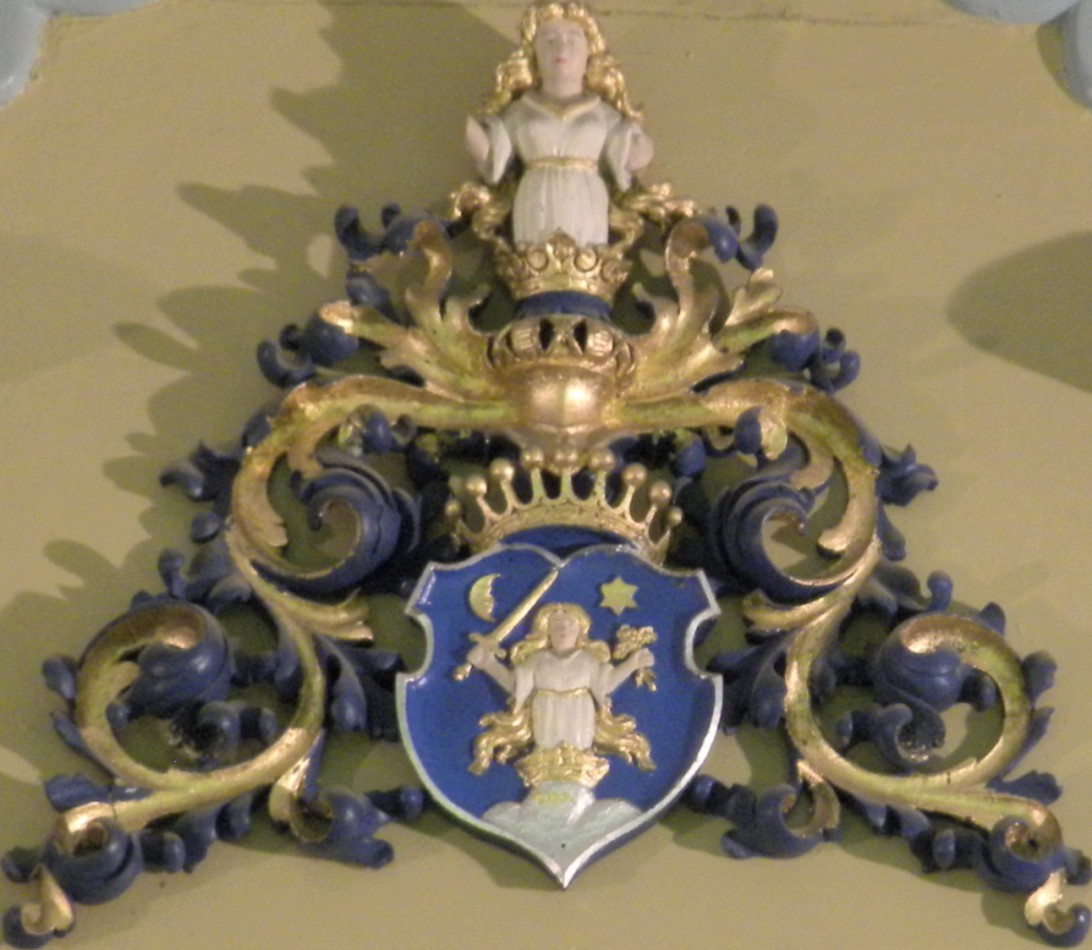
Coat of arms of the Szapáry family

The House of Szapáry (Hungarian: Szapáry de Muraszombath, Széchysziget et Szapár) is an old and important Hungarian noble family, which derived its name from the village of Szapár.

== History ==
The family can trace their noble lineage back to the first half of the 16th century, in particular from a local nobleman György Szapáry de Szapár (1527-1592).

In 1690 they were awarded with the title of Baron by Leopold I, Holy Roman Emperor.

Members of this family were upgraded to the title of Imperial Count (Hungarian: grof), granted to them on 28 December 1722 by Charles VI, Holy Roman Emperor and many of them played a prominent military, political, diplomatic and philanthropic role in the history of the Austro-Hungarian Empire.

== Notable family members ==
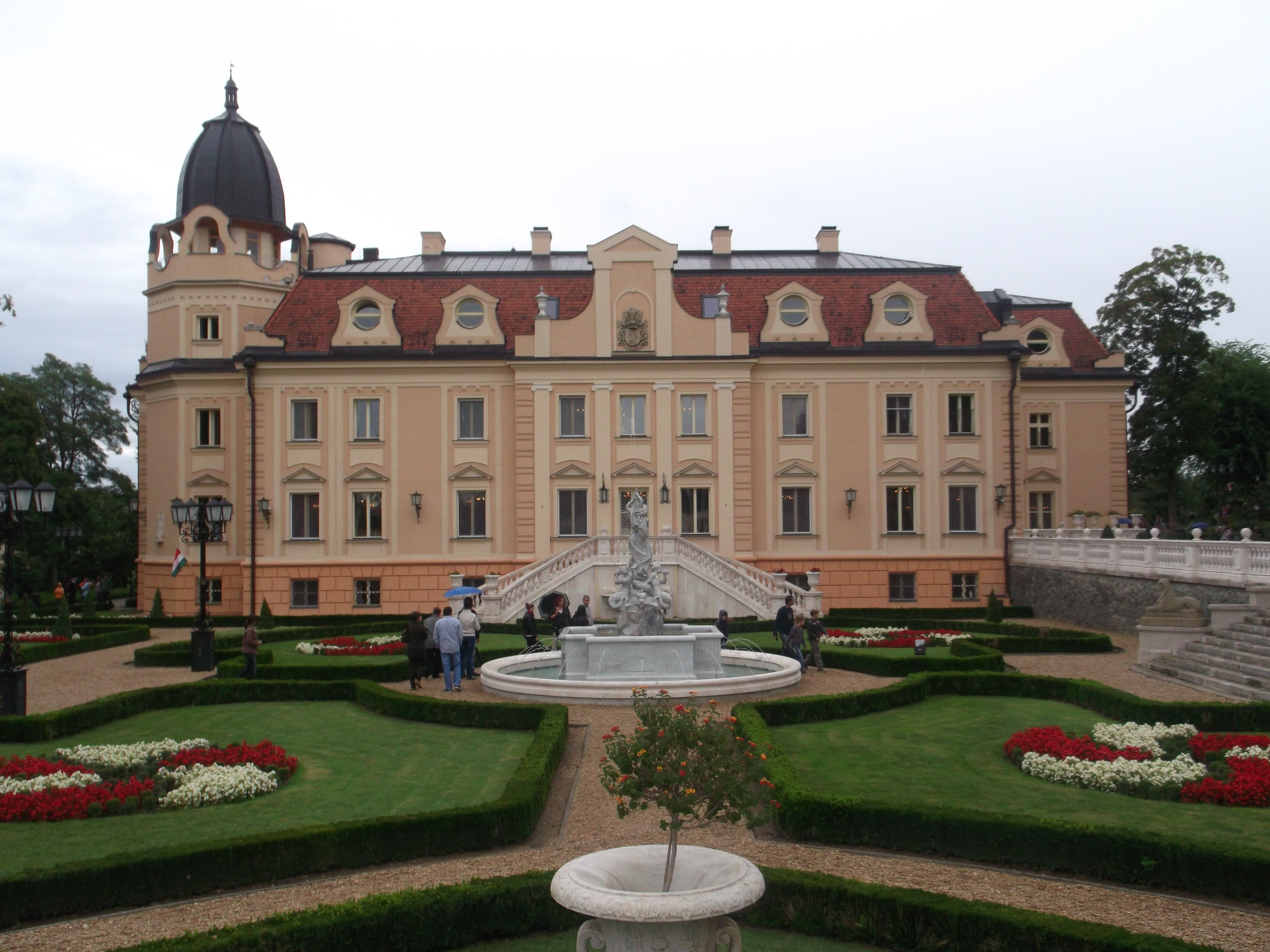
Szapáry castle in Sorokpolány, Hungary

- Etelka Szapáry (1798–1876), Hungarian noblewoman
- László Szapáry (1831–1883), Austro-Hungarian general who played a leading role in the occupation of Bosnia and Herzegovina in 1878
- Gyula Szapáry (1832–1905), Prime Minister of Hungary from 1890 to 1892
- Count Sándor Szápáry (1858-1904), owner and rebuilder of Finstergrün Castle in Austria
- Frigyes Szapáry (1869–1935), Ambassador of the Austro-Hungarian Empire to the Russian Empire at the outbreak of World War I, who played a key role during the July Crisis of 1914. He is the grandfather of Princess Michael of Kent.
- Margit Szapáry (1871–1943), German salonnière
- György Szapáry (born 1938), Hungarian–Belgian economist and diplomat
- Yvonne Szapáry (born 1944), married to Prince Karl of Hesse

== Related people ==
- Princess Michael of Kent – on her maternal grandfather's side.
