= Margit Szapáry =

German-Hungarian noblewoman

Countess Margit Szapáry
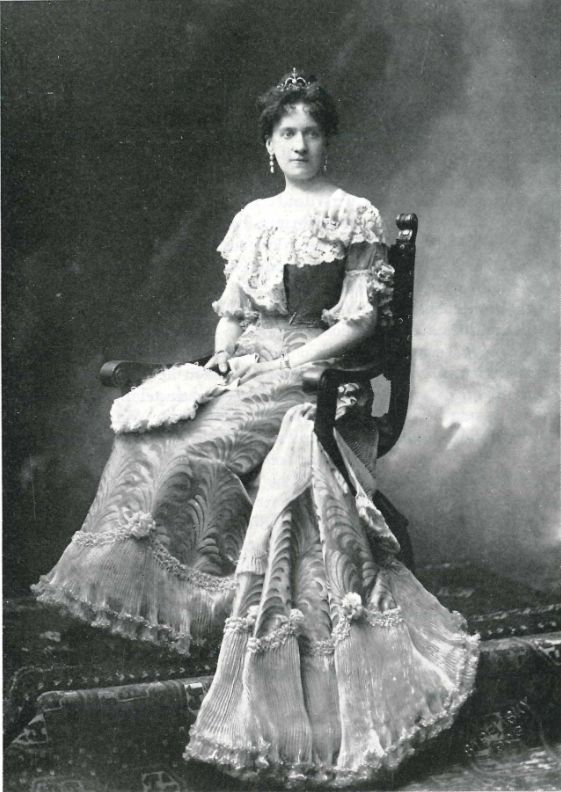
- Szapáry in 1900
- Born: Margarete Luise Laura Fanny Wanda Regina Gräfin Henckel von Donnersmarck; 21 February 1871; Dresden, Kingdom of Saxony
- Died: 17 May 1943 (aged 72); Ramingstein, Austria
- Noble family: Henckel von Donnersmarck (by birth); Szapáry (by marriage)
- Spouse: Count Sándor Szapáry
- Issue: Count Béla Szapáry; Countess Jolánta Szapáry
- Father: Count Hugo ll Henckel von Donnersmarck
- Mother: Countess Wanda von Gaschin zu Rosenberg

Countess Margit Szapáry (née Countess Margarete Henckel von Donnersmarck; 21 February 1871 – 17 May 1943) was a German salonnière, philanthropist, and member of the German Catholic Women's Association. She owned Finstergrün Castle in Austria.

== Biography ==
Szapáry was born Countess Margarete Luise Laura Wanda Regina Henckel von Donnersmarck in Dresden on 21 February 1871. A member of the House of Henckel von Donnersmarck, she was the daughter of Count Hugo ll Henckel von Donnersmarck (1832-1908) and Countess Wanda von Gaschin zu Rosenberg (1837-1908). She was the granddaughter of an entrepreneur, landowner and industrialist Count Hugo Henckel von Donnersmarck.

She married the Hungarian aristocrat Count Sándor Szapáry (1858-1904) on 18 July 1900. They had two children, Count Béla Szapáry (1901-1993) (father-in-law of Prince Karl of Hesse) and Countess Jolánta Szapáry (1902-1987). After her husband's death in 1904, she took over the renovations of their home, Finstergrün Castle. In the 1920s, Countess Szapáry hosted salons at the castle, hosting influential guests including Rudolf Rameck and Kurt von Schuschnigg. In the 1930s and 1940s, she rented rooms in the castle to selected paying guests.

She was active in the German Catholic Women's Association.

== Death ==
She died on 17 May 1943 in Ramingstein.
