= Finstergrün Castle =

Castle in Austria

Coordinates: 47.073°N 13.843°E

Finstergrün Castle (Burg Finstergrün)
- Salzburg, Austria
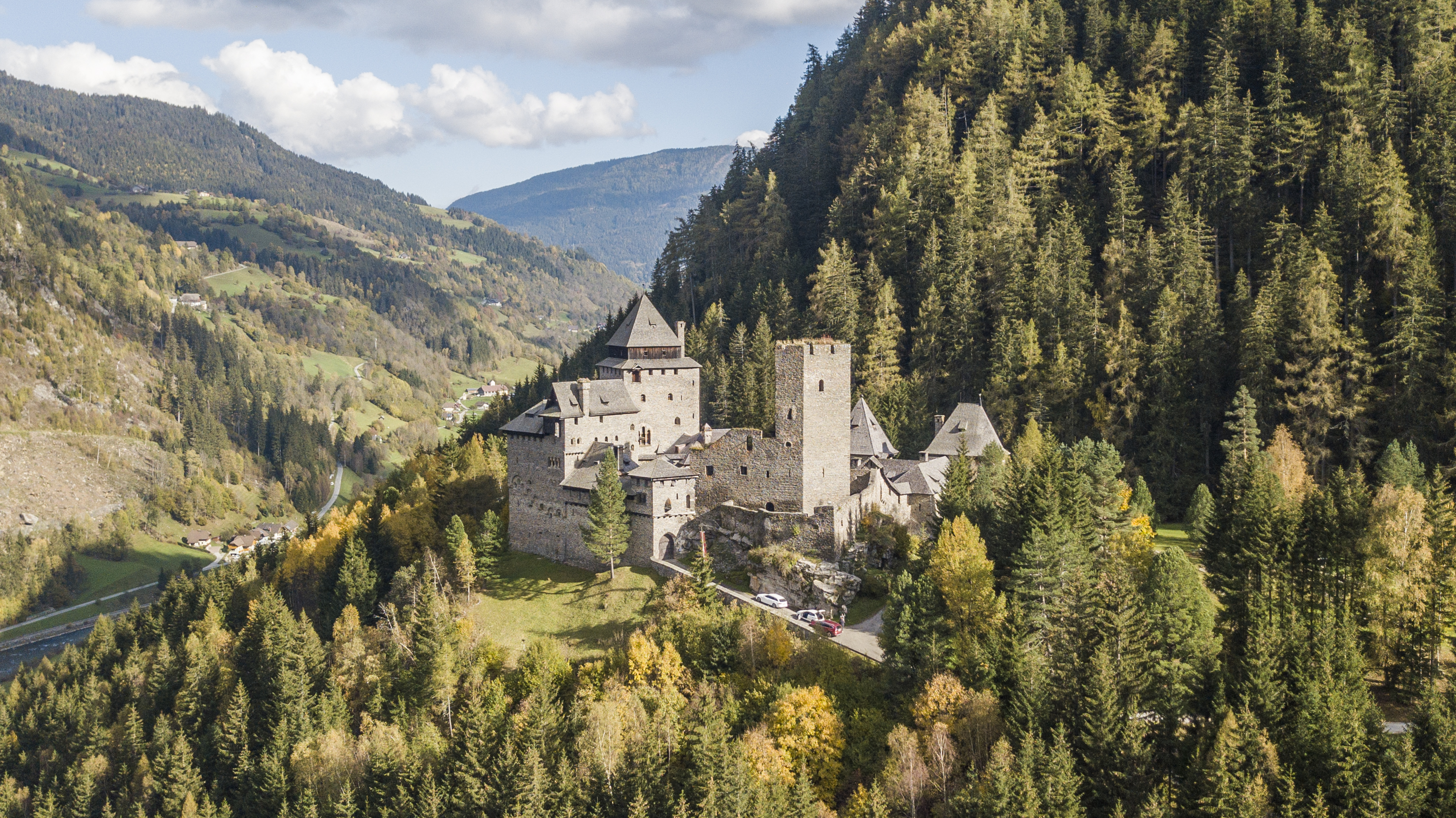

Site information
- Type: Castle

Finstergrün Castle (German: Burg Finstergrün) is a castle at Ramingstein in the state of Salzburg, Austria. Burg Finstergrün is 1,087 metres (3,566 ft) above sea level. The castle is believed to have been built in 1296/97 by Rudolf von Fohnsdorf. In 1300 it was described as “a border fortress” between the Archbishopric of Salzburg and the Duchy of Styria. During the 14th and 15th centuries it became the seat of the administrator who was in charge of managing the silver mines in Ramingstein. The first documented mention of the name Burg Finstergruen (dark ditch, from „finstre Gruam“) occurred in 1629.

In 1841 the castle complex was destroyed by a forest fire. In 1899 a new owner, Count Sándor Szapáry (1858-1904), bought the castle and rebuilt a comfortable house in 13th-century style adjacent to the ruins. It was later inherited by his son. In the 1930s and 1940s the castle belonged to his widow, Countess Margit Szapáry, who took in selected paying guests.

After the Second World War, Burg Finstergrün became a venue for the activities of the Austrian Evangelical Youth movement.

== See also ==
- List of castles in Austria
