= László Szőgyény-Marich Jr. =

Austro-Hungarian diplomat (1841–1916)

Count László Szőgyény-Marich de Magyar-Szőgyén et Szolgaegyháza
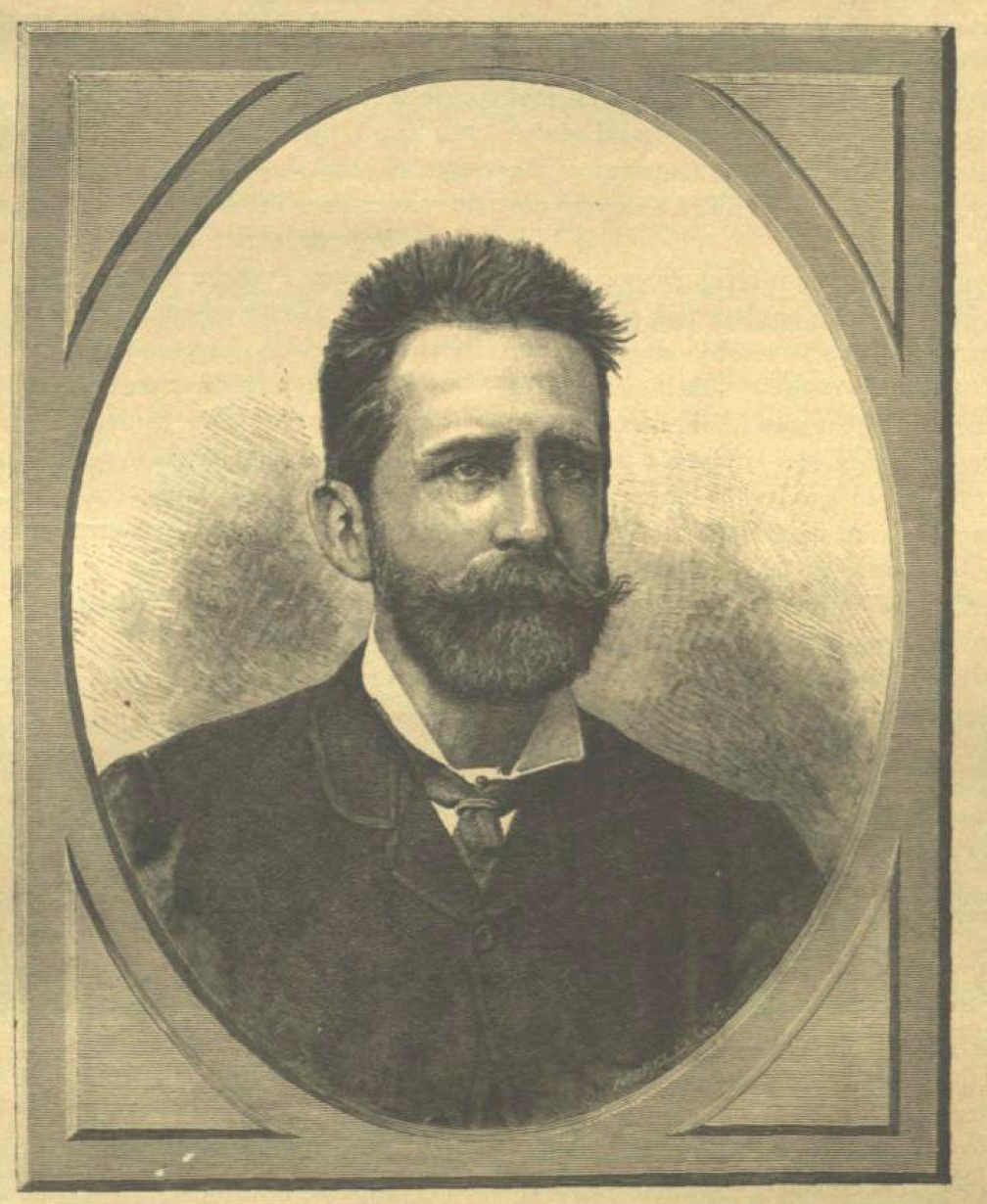

Second Section Chief in the Imperial Foreign Ministry
- In office 15 June 1882 – 2 May 1883
- Preceded by: Ladislaus Graf von Hoyos-Sprinzenstein
- Succeeded by: Marius Freiherr Pasetti-Angeli von Friedenburg

First Section Chief in the Imperial Foreign Ministry
- In office 2 May 1883 – 24 December 1890
- Preceded by: Ladislaus Graf von Hoyos-Sprinzenstein
- Succeeded by: Marius Freiherr Pasetti-Angeli von Friedenburg

Minister besides the King of Hungary
- In office 24 December 1890 – 24 October 1892
- Preceded by: Béla Baron Orczy de Orczi
- Succeeded by: Géza Baron Fejérváry de Komlós-Keresztes

Austro-Hungarian Ambassador to Germany
- In office 24 October 1892 – 4 August 1914
- Preceded by: Emmerich Graf Széchényi von Sárvár und Felsövidék
- Succeeded by: Gottfried Prinz zu Hohenlohe-Waldenburg-Schillingfürst, Ratibor und Corvey

Personal details
- Born: 12 November 1841 Vienna, Austrian Empire (now Austria)
- Died: 11 June 1916 (aged 74) Csór, Austria-Hungary (now Hungary)
- Spouse: Irma von Geramb
- Children: Zsigmond; Kamilla; Mária; Ilona
- Parent(s): László Szőgyény-Marich Sr. Mária Marich de Szolgaegyháza

Count László Szőgyény-Marich de Magyar-Szőgyén et Szolgaegyháza (German: Ladislaus Freiherr (from 1910, Graf) von Szögyény-Marich von Magyar-Szögyén und Szolgaegyháza) (12 November 1841 – 11 June 1916) was an Austro-Hungarian diplomat of Hungarian origin who was a long serving Ambassador at Berlin.

== Life ==
Born in Vienna on 12 November 1841 into an old Hungarian noble family as son of László, a former judex curiae (chief justice) of Hungary.

Szőgyény completed his secondary education in Székesfehérvár and studied law at the University of Vienna. In 1861, he became the deputy notary of Fejér County, and two years later, he was appointed as a law clerk at the Royal Court of Appeal in Pest.

In 1864, he traveled through Switzerland, France, Spain, and Italy with his friend, Minister of Finance Béni Kállay. In 1865, he was appointed as a judge in Fejér County, and in 1867, he received an appointment as chief notary of Fejér County.

He was elected to the Hungarian parliament in 1869 where he represented the Deák Party, then the Liberal Party. In 1883, he left the parliament to enter the Foreign Ministry of Austria-Hungary as Second Section Chief and was later promoted to First Section Chief. On 24 December 1890, he was appointed to serve as Minister besides the King of Hungary and was made a member of the Upper House.

On 24 October 1892, Emperor Franz Joseph I appointed him ambassador to Germany and he presented his credentials to the Kaiser at Berlin on 12 November. He would hold on to this position for twenty-two years, an extraordinarily long tenure even by the standards of the time. He owed his position due to his close connections, in particular Franz Joseph's protection – he had been a close confidant and friend of Crown Prince Rudolf and dealt with the latter's papers following the Mayerling incident – and not even Count Lexa von Aehrenthal could have him replaced.

Considered shrewd and calculating but also unimaginative, he was a personal friend of the Kaiser and the most senior Habsburg ambassador. On 17 April 1910, he was elevated to the rank of a Count.

In the summer of 1914, he was still Ambassador at Berlin despite his advanced age and being partly deaf. In order to bypass him, Foreign Minister Count von Berchtold dispatched his chef de cabinet Count von Hoyos on 4 July as a special envoy to Berlin to request support from the Kaiser for the Austro-Hungarian plans for action against Serbia. Count von Hoyos arrived the following day from Vienna and reviewed the documents with Count Szőgyény-Marich before the latter met with the Kaiser at Potsdam for lunch. In the evening he cabled Count von Berchtold that he had received "full German backing" in any action that Vienna decided to take, even if "serious European complications" resulted, requesting only that it would be done speedily.

Nevertheless, it was indeed Szőgyény-Marich who delivered the historically important letter from the Austro-Hungarian Emperor Franz Joseph (dated 2.July) to the German counterpart, Wilhelm II at 5.July.

The Kaiser's pledge was confirmed the following day by Chancellor Bethmann Hollweg and Zimmermann, the Under Secretary of State. Austria-Hungary had received the so-called 'blank check' promising German support for an Austro-Hungarian attack on Serbia. Count Szőgyény-Marich's action during this critical month has been much debated by historians, some arguing that he did not fully grasp all the intrinsic details in the conversations he entertained with German leaders, in particular that he exaggerated the German support, and that his reports to Vienna therefore were misleading.

Strained by the burdens of the July Crisis, Count Szőgyény-Marich was succeeded as Ambassador by Prince Gottfried von Hohenlohe-Schillingsfürst on 4 August, his replacement having been discussed long before the advent of war but blocked by his alleged refusal to make a graceful exit.

Count Szőgyény-Marich retired to his estate in Csór where he died two years later on 11 June 1916. He had been invested as a Knight of the Order of the Golden Fleece in 1900.

Political offices
Preceded by Béla Baron Orczy de Orczi	Minister besides the King; 1890–1892	Succeeded by Géza Baron Fejérváry de Komlós-Keresztes
Diplomatic posts
Preceded by Ladislaus Graf von Hoyos-Sprinzenstein	Second Section Chief in the Imperial Foreign Ministry; 1882–1883	Succeeded by Marius Freiherr Pasetti-Angeli von Friedenburg
Preceded by Ladislaus Graf von Hoyos-Sprinzenstein	First Section Chief in the Imperial Foreign Ministry; 1883–1890	Succeeded by Marius Freiherr Pasetti-Angeli von Friedenburg
Preceded by Emmerich Graf Széchényi von Sárvár und Felsövidék	Austro-Hungarian Ambassador to Germany; 1892–1914	Succeeded by Gottfried Prinz zu Hohenlohe-Waldenburg-Schillingfürst, Ratibor und Corvey
