= Leopold Berchtold =

Austro-Hungarian politician (1863–1942)

Graf Leopold Berchtold
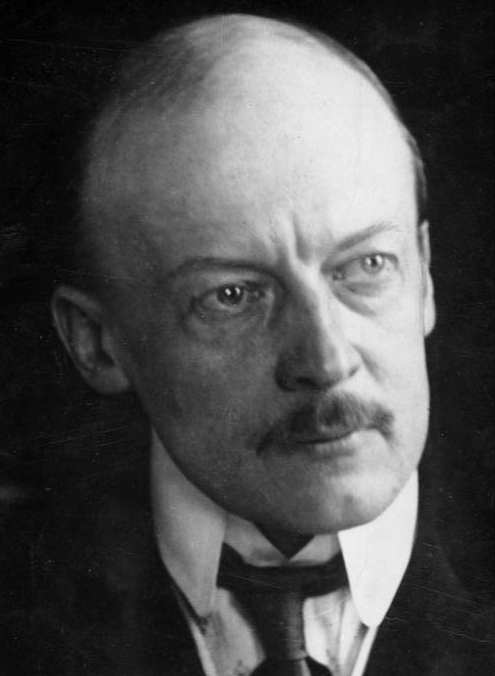
- Count von Berchtold c. 1922

Foreign Minister of Austria-Hungary
- In office 17 February 1912 – 13 January 1915
- Preceded by: Alois Graf Lexa von Aehrenthal
- Succeeded by: Stephan Freiherr Burián von Rajecz

Austro-Hungarian Ambassador to Russia
- In office 28 December 1906 – 25 March 1911
- Preceded by: Alois Graf Lexa von Aehrenthal
- Succeeded by: Duglas Graf von Thurn und Valsássina-Como-Vercelli

Member of the House of Magnates
- In office 16 June 1900 – 16 November 1918

Personal details
- Born: 18 April 1863 Vienna, Lower Austria, Archduchy of Austria, Austrian Empire
- Died: 21 November 1942 (aged 79) Peresznye, Sopron County, Kingdom of Hungary
- Spouse: Countess Ferdinanda Károlyi de Nagykároly (m. 1893; died 1942)
- Children: 3

Leopold Anton Johann Sigismund Josef Korsinus Ferdinand Graf Berchtold von und zu Ungarschitz, Frättling und Püllütz (Hungarian: Gróf Berchtold Lipót, Czech: Leopold hrabě Berchtold z Uherčic) (18 April 1863 – 21 November 1942) was an Austro-Hungarian politician, diplomat and statesman who served as his nation's Foreign Minister at the outbreak of the First World War.

== Life ==
=== Early life ===
Born in Vienna on 18 April 1863 as the son of Count Sigismund Berchtold von und zu Ungarschitz, Frättling und Püllütz (1834–1900) and his wife, Countess Josephine von Trauttmansdorff-Weinsberg (1835–1894). He belonged to a wealthy Austrian noble family that owned lands in Moravia and Hungary. (Note: Berchtold's nationality has sometimes been subjected to attention by historians as his aristocratic bloodlines made him part German, part Czech, part Slovak, and part Hungarian. An anecdote of this identity dilemma can be found on 'Graf Leopold Berchtold von und zu Ungarschütz, Frättling, und Püllütz', Solving Problems Through Force) He was reputed to be one of Austria-Hungary's richest men.

His paternal grandparents were Count Siegmund Andreas Corsinus Berchtold von und zu Ungarschitz and Countess Ludmilla Maria Theresia Wratislavová z Mitrowicz. His maternal grandparents were Franz Joseph Ferdinand von Trauttmansdorff-Weinsberg (grandson of Prince Ferdinand von Trauttmansdorff) and Countess Josephine Károlyi de Nagykárolyi.

Tutored at home, he later studied law and joined the Austro-Hungarian foreign service in 1893.

=== Career ===
After his 1893 marriage, he served at the embassies in Paris (1894), London (1899) and St. Petersburg (1903). In December 1906, Count Berchtold was appointed as the successor of Count Alois von Aehrenthal as Ambassador to Russia upon the latter's appointment as imperial foreign minister. He served with distinction for five years in St. Petersburg and experienced Russia's distrust and fear of Vienna. In September 1908, he hosted a secret meeting between Aehrenthal and the Russian Foreign Minister Alexander Izvolsky at his estate at Buchlau in Moravia. This meeting produced the so-called Buchlau bargain and led to the Austro-Hungarian annexation of Bosnia and Herzegovina.

At the death of Aehrenthal in February 1912, Count Berchtold was appointed as his successor and thus became, at the age of 49, the youngest foreign minister in Europe. His appointment reportedly came against his own will and despite lack of experience in domestic affairs, as well as in military matters.

=== Balkan Wars ===
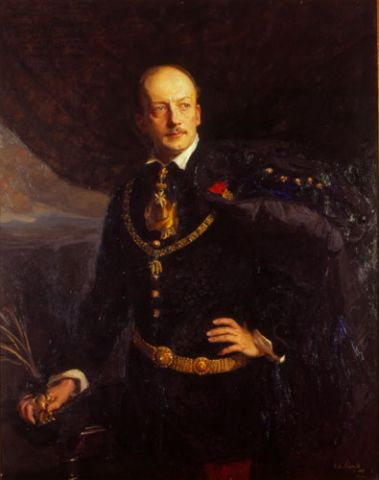
Portrait by Philip de László, 1906

As imperial foreign minister, Count Berchtold focused almost exclusively on the Balkans where his foreign policy aims were to maintain peace, stick to the principle of non-intervention and preserve the territorial status quo. The Balkan Wars in 1912/1913, however, quickly made such a policy illusory.

At the outset of the Balkan Wars, Count Berchtold pursued a hard-line policy and flirted with the idea of war against Serbia, but vacillated and pulled back from intervention at the last moment. Although he managed to prevent Serbia from securing an outlet to the Adriatic Sea by support given to the creation of Albania, the Balkan Wars resulted in a failure to contain the rising Russian influence in the Balkans and thwart Serbian ambitions for a united Yugoslav state. It meant diplomatic defeat for Austria-Hungary and also a reputation of being weak and indecisive for Count Berchtold.

Count Berchtold's focus on Serbia was grown out of a fear of Serbian territorial expansion in the Balkans and also a complication of frictional matters within the multinational Dual Monarchy, and would eventually result in the dissolution of the empire itself.

=== July Crisis ===
Following the Balkan Wars, the assassination of Archduke Franz Ferdinand at Sarajevo on 28 June 1914 was therefore a culmination of the heightened tension between Austria-Hungary and Serbia. If Count Berchtold had been accused of indecisiveness and diffidence during the Balkan Wars, he gave proof of more resolve during the July Crisis. Pushed by the so-called Young Rebels at the Ballhausplatz led by Count Hoyos, his chef de cabinet, Count Berchtold seized the opportunity to launch punitive action against Serbia and deal the country a mortal blow.

After having dispatched Count Hoyos on a mission to Berlin on 5 July to secure German support for Austria-Hungary's future actions, which resulted in the famous "blank cheque", he became the leading spokesman, together with the Chief of the Austro-Hungarian General Staff General Conrad von Hötzendorf, for war against Serbia during the meeting of the Imperial Crown Council on 7 July. Through the moderating influence of the Hungarian Minister-President Count István Tisza, who had reservations on the use of force against Serbia, it was decided to present Serbia with an ultimatum. The ten-point ultimatum was presented to Emperor Franz Joseph on 21 July and transmitted to Belgrade on 23 July. The previous night, according to his wife Nadine's testimony, Count Berchtold spent a sleepless night, altering the ultimatum and adding clauses, as he was very worried the Serbs could accept it. The Serbian government accepted all points of the ultimatum but the one that permitted Austro-Hungarian authorities to participate in the investigation of the assassination on Serbian territory, which would have been a severe violation of Serbian sovereignty and the country's constitution. As the acceptance of all 10 demands listed in the ultimatum was required, the Austro-Hungarian government made a decision to enter a state of war with Serbia on 28 July, for which Berchtold is described as being largely to blame.

=== World War I ===
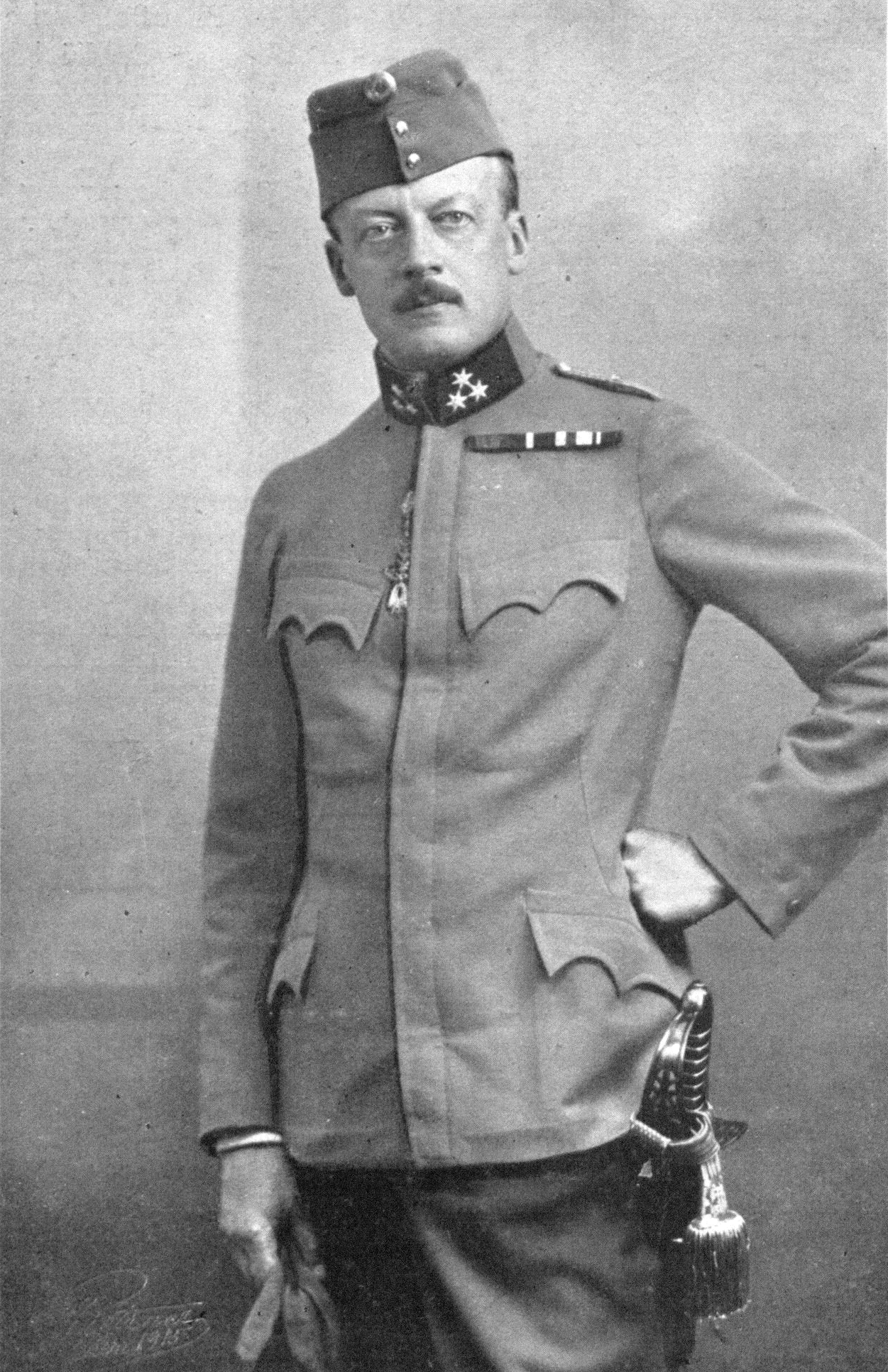
Berchtold in uniform. Photograph by Carl Pietzner

Once war had started, Count Berchtold focused his efforts on the question of Italy's participation, the outcome of which would lead to his downfall. The main problem was Italy's demands for territorial compensation in exchange for remaining within the Triple Alliance. When Rome presented the Ballhausplatz with demands for control over territories in southern Austria-Hungary, Berchtold demurred and refused to offer any Habsburg concessions, especially not in the Trentino.

However, Italian Foreign Minister Baron Sidney Sonnino succeeded in obtaining vague promises of compensations in South Tyrol from Germany and by the end of 1914, Count Berchtold informed the Crown Council that the choice was either acceptance of the Italian demands or a declaration of war. Both Count Tisza and General Conrad von Hötzendorf expressed a preference for the latter. Under mounting German pressure, Count Berchtold, however, indicated that he was ready to cede the Trentino and parts of the Albanian coastline. When he informed Tisza and Conrad of the concessions he was ready to give, they forced him to resign on 13 January 1915. At Count Tisza's insistence he was replaced by the more pugnacious Count Burián.

Berchtold played no further public role during the war, although he was appointed Lord High Steward to Archduke Charles, the heir apparent, in March 1916, and became Lord Chamberlain following the latter's accession to the throne in November. Count Berchtold had been invested as a Knight of the Order of the Golden Fleece in 1912 and bestowed with the Grand Cross of the Order of Saint Stephen in 1914.

After his resignation as foreign minister in 1917, he served as Grand Chamberlain (Oberstkammerer) of Emperor Charles I. Thus he was responsible for inspecting the ancestral tree and other documents submitted from those nobles who wished to be considered for the honorary post of chamberlain. These would be laid before the emperor for approval or rejection, or whether an exception would be made.

After the war, he retired as a grand seigneur on his estate at Peresznye near Csepreg in Hungary.

=== Personal life ===
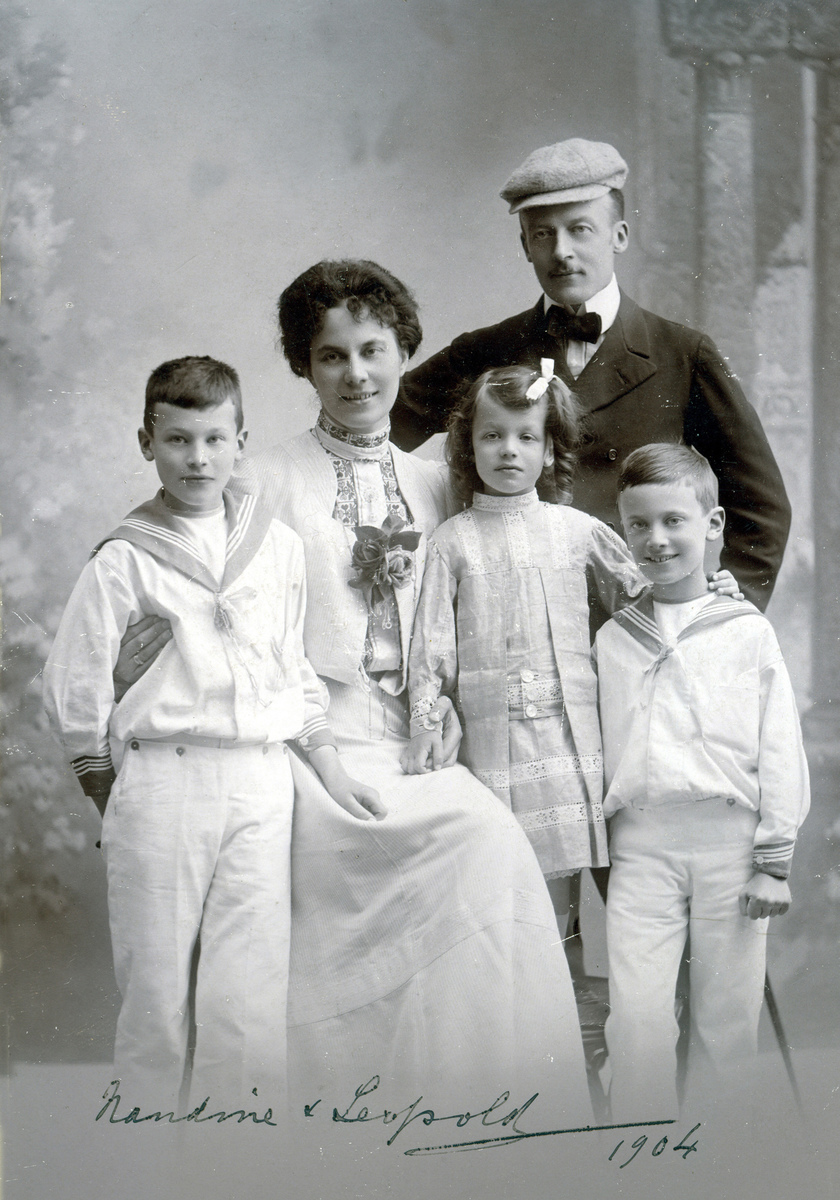
Berchtold with his family, 1904.

On 25 January 1893 in Budapest, he married Countess Ferdinanda Károlyi de Nagykároly (1868–1955), the daughter of Countess Franciska "Fanni" Erdödy and Count Alajos Károlyi, one of the richest aristocrats in Hungary who served as the Austrian ambassador to the German Empire, as well as to the United Kingdom. Her maternal aunt, Countess Hanna Erdödy, was the wife of Count Béla Széchenyi von Sárvár-Felsövidék, a "personal friend" of King Edward VII. Together, they were the parents of two sons:

- Count Aloys "Louis" Berchtold von und zu Ungarschitz (1894–1977), who never married.
- Count Adalbert "Bela" Berchtold von und zu Ungarschitz (1895–1906), who died young.
- Count Sigismund "Sziga" Berchtold von und zu Ungarschitz (1900–1979), who married Countess Maria Anna "Etti" Esterházy (née von Wurmbrand-Stuppach), the former wife of Clendenin J. Ryan, Count Paul Pálffy ab Erdöd, and Count Tamás Esterházy, in 1944. They divorced in 1949 and she married William Deering Davis and then Árpád Plesch. Sziga then married Emilia de Gosztonyi (former wife of Michael Bankier and Robin Alexander Lyle) in 1953. After their divorce in 1956, she married Prince Vsevolod Ivanovich of Russia. Sziga then married Eva Machan, the former wife of Count Leopold zu Hardegg auf Glatz und im Machlande, in 1967.

Once, in Karlsbad, he was asked what nationality he identified as, German, Hungarian, or Czech. Berchtold replied he was Viennese. He was pressed to answer and asked what side he would take in the event of conflict between the nationalities. Berchtold confidently replied, “the side of the emperor.”

Berchtold died at Peresznye on 21 November 1942 and was buried in the family tomb at Buchlau.

== Legacy ==
Count Berchtold was described at the time as "intelligent and hard-working" and possessed of a "great personal charm" that made him well-liked at court. Indeed, he possessed all the social graces required at the Hofburg and impressed with his aristocratic background. However he lacked the strength of character and broad experience that would have been desirable in an imperial foreign minister. This contributed to quick reversals of decisions, giving rise to a foreign policy often perceived as inconsistent and vacillating.

Many historians have regarded him as indecisive and diffident. However, during the July Crisis this appears not to have been the case as he "commanded and managed the process" on this occasion. His responsibility for the outbreak of the First World War has been much debated by historians. Without a doubt, he played a leading role in the intransigent formulation in the ultimatum of 23 July, the declaration of war on 28 July, and the rebuttal of Grey's mediation proposal on 29 July. He believed that only the defeat of Serbia could preserve the Dual Monarchy. Despite that, he was not thought of as a warmonger by, for example, General Conrad von Hötzendorf. At the same time, his lack of self-confidence at the helm of Austro-Hungarian diplomacy made him susceptible to persuasion by his pro-war staff at the Ballhausplatz, on whose advice and opinions he was heavily dependent.

Although Berchtold may have personally pushed for war, the main question is whether he appreciated that a war against Serbia carried the risk of a major European war. According to G. A. Tunstall Jr, "a Russian intervention doesn't seem to had been taken into much consideration by the Austro-Hungarian leaders during the decision-making process". In any case, "if he did not apprehend the consequences of his policies sufficiently, he was, however, not alone; as a matter of fact, there were few diplomats at the time who actually did". Alexander Watson, however, maintains that Berchtold was well aware of possible Russian complications, knowing that "Serbia's humiliation would matter deeply to the eastern colossus," possibly encouraged by Franz Conrad von Hötzendorf, who was confident "that with Germany's help he could beat Serbia and Russia." Holger Herwig similarly maintains that Berchtold acted in a calculated manner during the July Crisis; for example, on July 26 he informed Franz Joseph that Serbian troops were confirmed to have fired on Habsburg forces at Temes Kubin (present-day Kovin) from Danubian steamers, in an attempt to convince the Emperor that Vienna would be fighting a defensive war. The Temes Kubin incident, however, never happened— a fact of which Herwig believes Berchtold was fully aware.

=== In film and television ===
Count Berchtold was portrayed by English actor John Gielgud in the 1969 film Oh! What a Lovely War.

== Awards ==
National orders and decorations

- Jubilee Court Medal (1898)
- Bronze Jubilee Medal for the Armed Forces (1898)
- Jubilee Cross for Civil Officials (1908)
- Grand Cross of the Imperial Order of Leopold, 1908; in Diamonds, 1911
- Knight of the Golden Fleece, 1912
- Grand Cross of St. Stephen, 1914; in Diamonds, 1915
- Military Merit Cross, 3rd Class with War Decoration, 1915

Foreign orders and decorations

- Bulgaria:
  - Grand Cross of St. Alexander, in Diamonds
  - Order of Bravery, 2nd Class
- Chile: Medal of the Merit, 1st Class
- Ethiopia: Grand Cross of the Star of Ethiopia
- France: Knight of the Legion of Honour
- Italy: Knight of the Annunciation, 22 October 1912
- Holy See: Grand Cross of the Order of Pope Pius IX
- Sovereign Military Order of Malta: Bailiff Grand Cross of Honour and Devotion
- Monaco: Grand Cross of St. Charles
- Montenegro: Grand Cross of the Order of Prince Danilo I
- Ottoman Empire:
  - Order of Osmanieh, 1st Class in Diamonds
  - Gallipoli Star
- Romania: Grand Cross of the Crown of Romania
- Russian Empire:
  - Knight of St. Alexander Nevsky
  - Knight of St. Stanislaus, 2nd Class
- Siam: Grand Cross of the White Elephant
- German Empire:
  - Knight of the Black Eagle
  - Iron Cross (1914), 2nd Class
  - Hohenzollern: Cross of Honour of the Princely House Order of Hohenzollern, 1st Class
  - Bavaria:
    - Knight of St. Hubert
    - Knight of the Military Merit Order, 4th Class with Crown
  - Saxony: Knight of the Rue Crown
  - Schaumburg-Lippe: Cross of Honour of the House Order of Schaumburg-Lippe, 1st Class

== See also ==
- Austro-Hungarian entry into World War I

== Notes ==
Diplomatic posts
Preceded by Alois Graf Lexa von Aehrenthal	Austro-Hungarian Ambassador to Russia; 1906–1911	Succeeded by Duglas Graf von Thurn und Valsássina-Como-Vercelli
Political offices
Preceded by Alois Graf Lexa von Aehrenthal	Foreign Minister of Austria-Hungary; 1912–1915	Succeeded by Stephan Freiherr Burián von Rajecz
