= Chef de Cabinet =

Senior civil servant who acts as an aide or private secretary to a government figure

In some Francophone countries and international organisations, a chef de cabinet (French; literally 'head of office') is a senior official working for a high-ranking political or administrative figure. The most prominent are those of the chief of state themselves or a government minister. They are typically responsible for running the office (cabinet) and may serve a similar function to a private secretary (United Kingdom) or chief of staff (United States). In fact, in Canada the position is called Chief of Staff to the Prime Minister in English since 1987. Previously the Canadian position was called "Principal Secretary", as it still is in several other Commonwealth countries.

The title is also used by the head of an office in the United Nations Secretariat, appointed by the Secretary-General, or in the European Commission, appointed by an individual European Commissioner for their personal cabinet. The current chef de cabinet to the United Nations Secretary-General is Courtenay Rattray of Jamaica.
