= Osvětimany =

- Market town
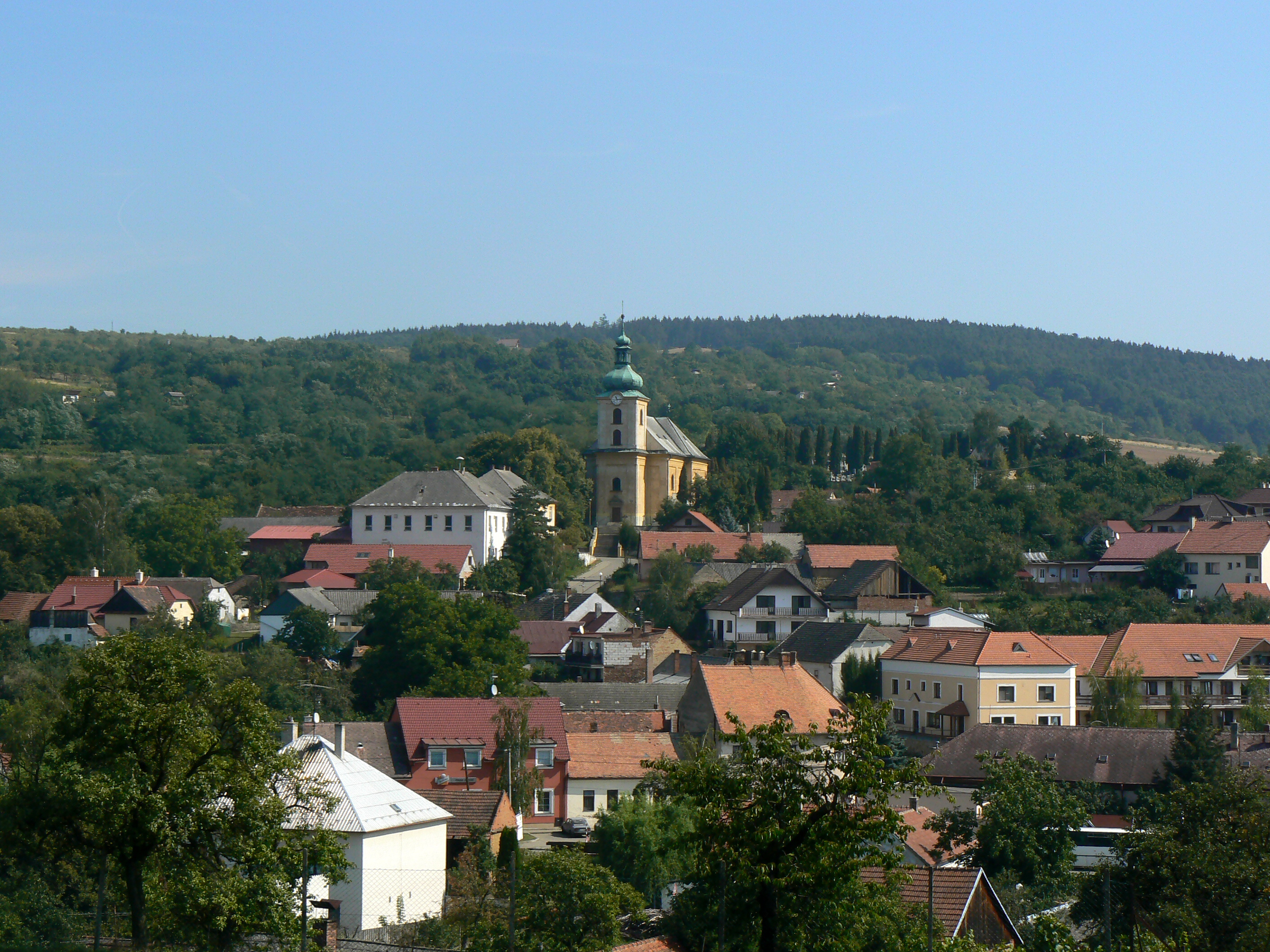
- General view

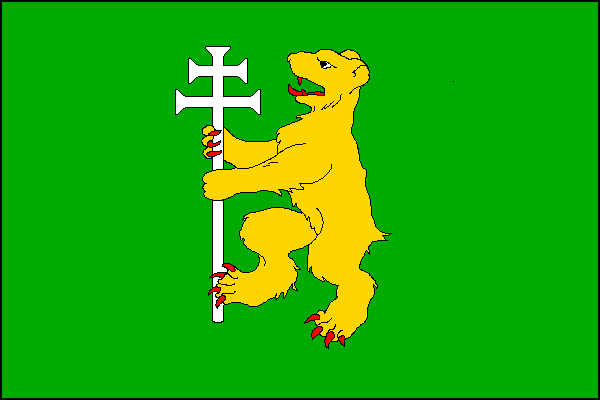
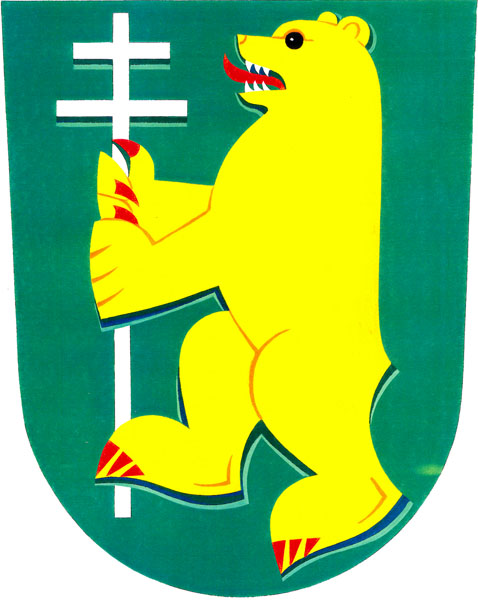
- Flag Coat of arms

- Location in the Czech Republic
- Coordinates: 49°3′21″N 17°14′59″E
- Country: Czech Republic
- Region: Zlín
- District: Uherské Hradiště
- First mentioned: 1350

Area
  - Total: 19.39 km^{2} (7.49 sq mi)
- Elevation: 278 m (912 ft)

Population (2026-01-01)
  - Total: 906
  - Density: 46.7/km^{2} (121/sq mi)
- Time zone: UTC+1 (CET)
  - Summer (DST): UTC+2 (CEST)
- Postal code: 687 42
- Website: www.osvetimany.cz

Osvětimany (Czech pronunciation: [ˈosvjɛcɪmanɪ]) is a market town in Uherské Hradiště District in the Zlín Region of the Czech Republic. It has about 900 inhabitants. The market town is located on the border between the Chřiby highlands and Kyjov Hills.

Osvětimany is known for the Gord of Saint Clement. It is an archaeological site, which is protected as a national cultural monument.

== Geography ==
Osvětimany is located about 15 kilometres (9 mi) west of Uherské Hradiště and 34 km (21 mi) southwest of Zlín. It lies on the border between the Chřiby highlands and Kyjov Hills. The highest point is at 536 m (1,759 ft) above sea level. The Hruškovice stream flows through the municipality. The Osvětimany Reservoir is built west of the built-up area, on the stream Klimentský potok.

== History ==
The first written mention of Osvětimany is from 1350. The owners of the village often changed and included various lesser nobles. From 1550 to 1918, Osvětimany belonged to the Buchlov estate.

In 1885, Osvětimany was promoted to a market town.

== Demographics ==
Historical population

Year	Pop.	±%
1869	853	—
1880	866	+1.5%
1890	975	+12.6%
1900	1,025	+5.1%
1910	1,067	+4.1%

Year	Pop.	±%
1921	1,059	−0.7%
1930	999	−5.7%
1950	999	+0.0%
1961	1,144	+14.5%
1970	1,027	−10.2%

Year	Pop.	±%
1980	871	−15.2%
1991	794	−8.8%
2001	833	+4.9%
2011	822	−1.3%
2021	857	+4.3%

Source: Censuses

== Transport ==
There are no railways or major roads passing through the municipality.

== Sights ==
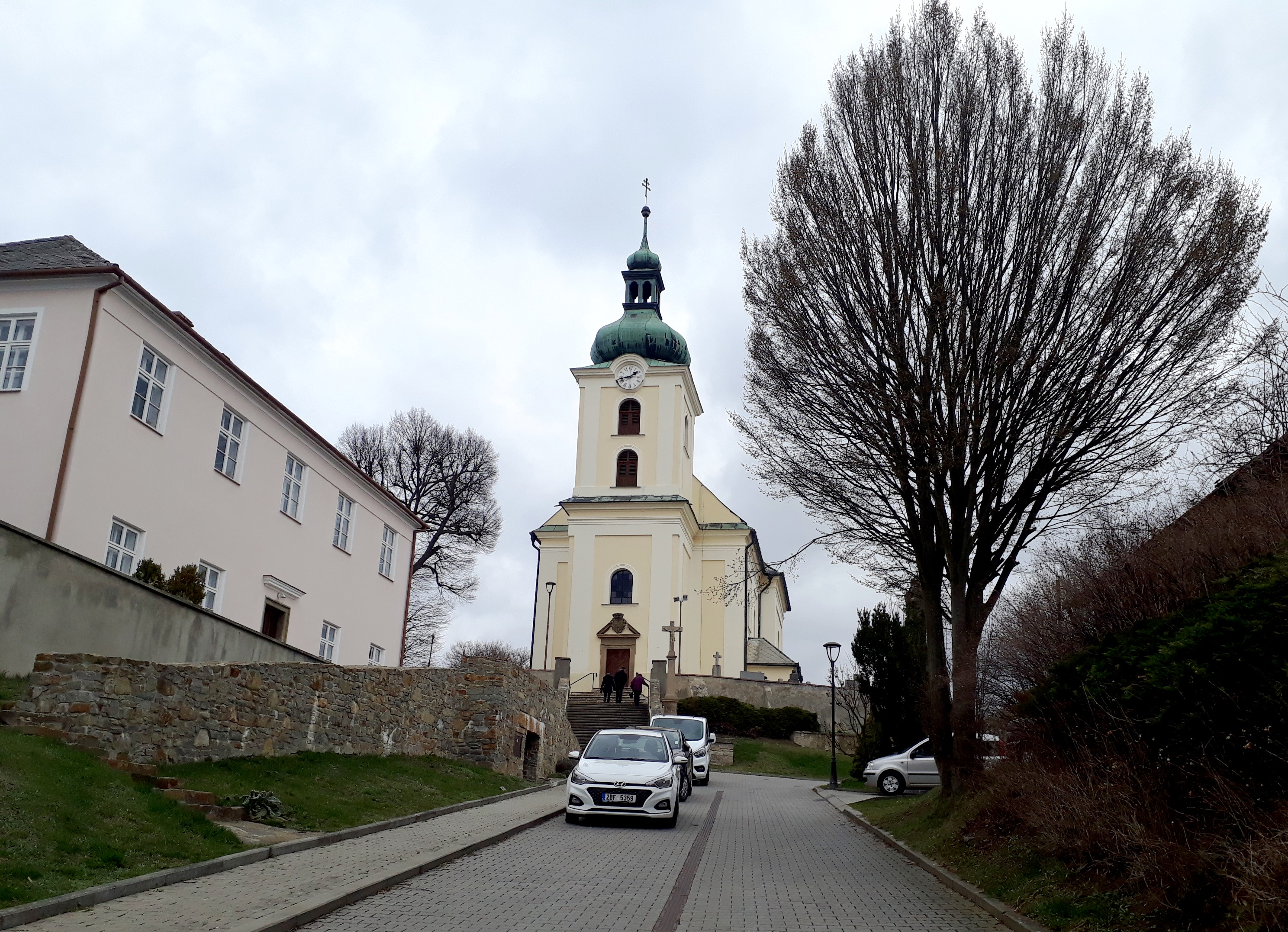
Church of Saint Gall

The main landmark of Osvětimany is the Church of Saint Gall. It was built in the Baroque style in the 18th century.

The most important monument is the Gord of Saint Clement. It is an archaeological site of a gord, which was founded in the time of Great Moravia. It was inhabited in the 9th–12th centuries. The site is protected as national cultural monument.

== Notable people ==
- Oldřich Pechal (1913–1942), soldier and resistance fighter
