= Buchlovice =

- Market town
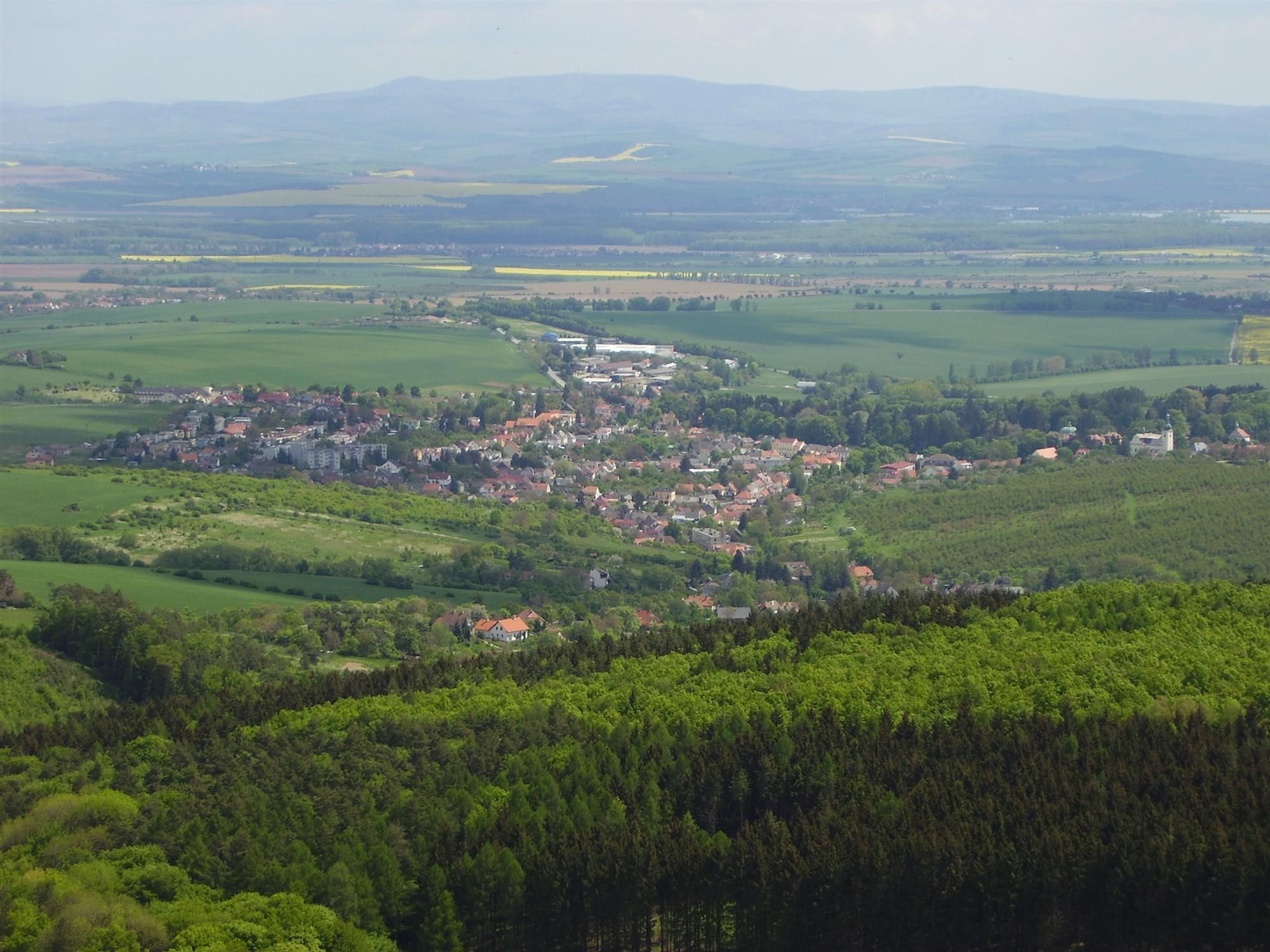
- View from Buchlov Castle

- Flag Coat of arms

- Location in the Czech Republic
- Coordinates: 49°5′11″N 17°20′19″E
- Country: Czech Republic
- Region: Zlín
- District: Uherské Hradiště
- First mentioned: 1207

Area
  - Total: 31.96 km^{2} (12.34 sq mi)
- Elevation: 234 m (768 ft)

Population (2026-01-01)
  - Total: 2,376
  - Density: 74.34/km^{2} (192.5/sq mi)
- Time zone: UTC+1 (CET)
  - Summer (DST): UTC+2 (CEST)
- Postal code: 687 08
- Website: www.buchlovice.cz

Buchlovice (Czech pronunciation: [ˈbuxlovɪtsɛ]; German: Buchlowitz) is a market town in Uherské Hradiště District in the Zlín Region of the Czech Republic. It has about 2,400 inhabitants. The town is located on the border between the Chřiby highlands and Kyjov Hills.

Buchlovice is known for the castles of Buchlovice and Buchlov, both of which are protectes as national cultural monuments.

== Geography ==
Buchlovice is located about 9 kilometres (6 mi) west of Uherské Hradiště and 26 km (16 mi) southwest of Zlín. It lies on the border between the Chřiby highlands and Kyjov Hills. The highest point is the hill Holý kopec at 548 m (1,798 ft) above sea level.

The streams Dlouhá řeka and Buchlovický potok flow through the municipality. Dlouhá řeka supplies the Sovín Reservoir, located south of the built-up area.

== History ==
The first written mention of Buchlovice is in a deed of King Ottokar I from 1207. The Buchlov Castle was first mentioned in 1300. In 1540, Buchlovice was bought by the Zierotin family and joined to the Buchlov estate. In 1805, the village was promoted to a market town by Emperor Francis II.

== Demographics ==
Historical population

Year	Pop.	±%
1869	2,007	—
1880	2,171	+8.2%
1890	2,322	+7.0%
1900	2,231	−3.9%
1910	2,306	+3.4%

Year	Pop.	±%
1921	2,244	−2.7%
1930	2,081	−7.3%
1950	1,889	−9.2%
1961	2,226	+17.8%
1970	2,139	−3.9%

Year	Pop.	±%
1980	2,403	+12.3%
1991	2,369	−1.4%
2001	2,448	+3.3%
2011	2,496	+2.0%
2021	2,406	−3.6%

Source: Censuses

== Transport ==
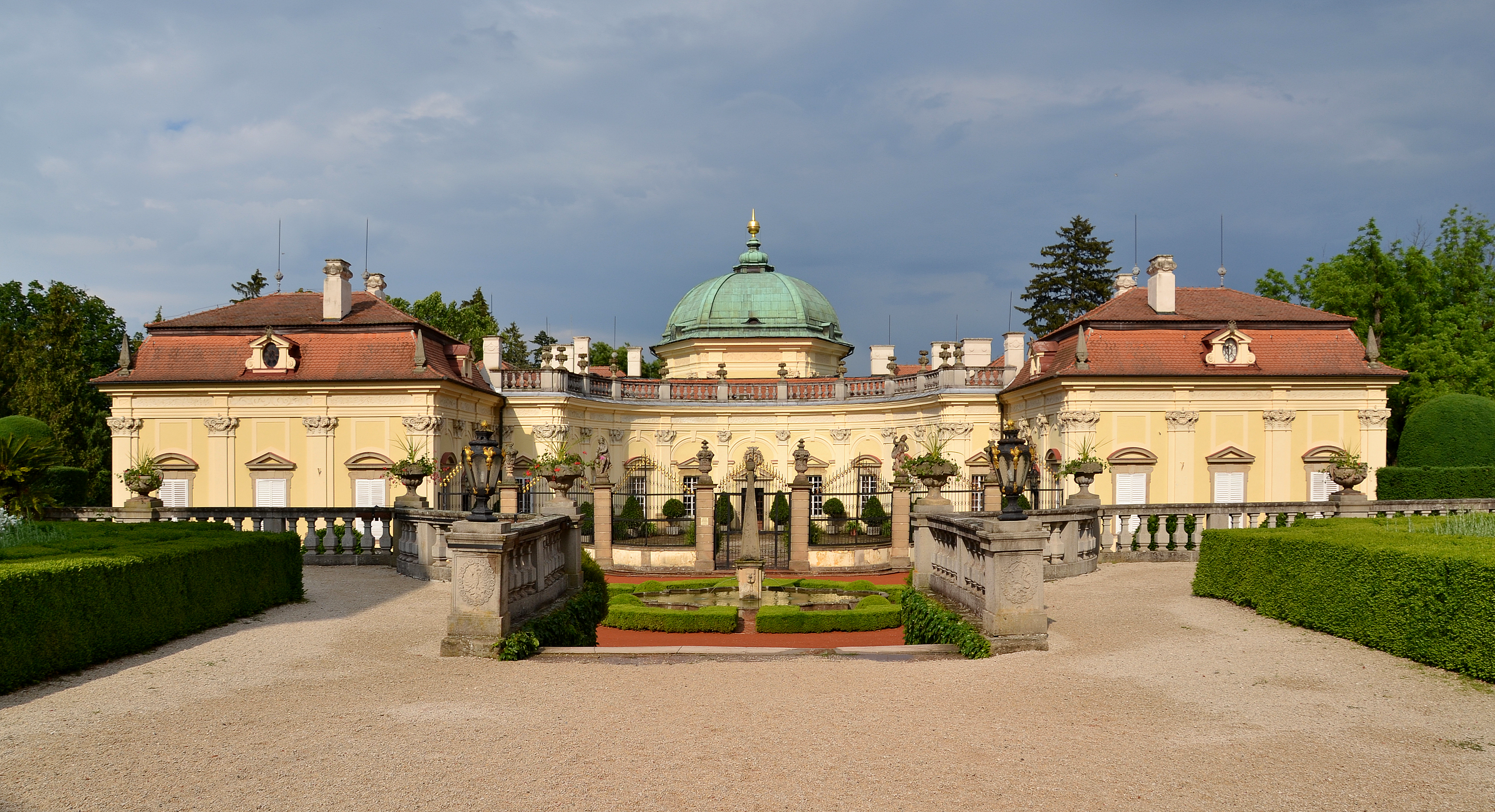
Buchlovice Castle

The I/50 road (part of the European route E50), which connects Brno with the Czech–Slovak border in Starý Hrozenkov, runs through the market town.

== Sights ==
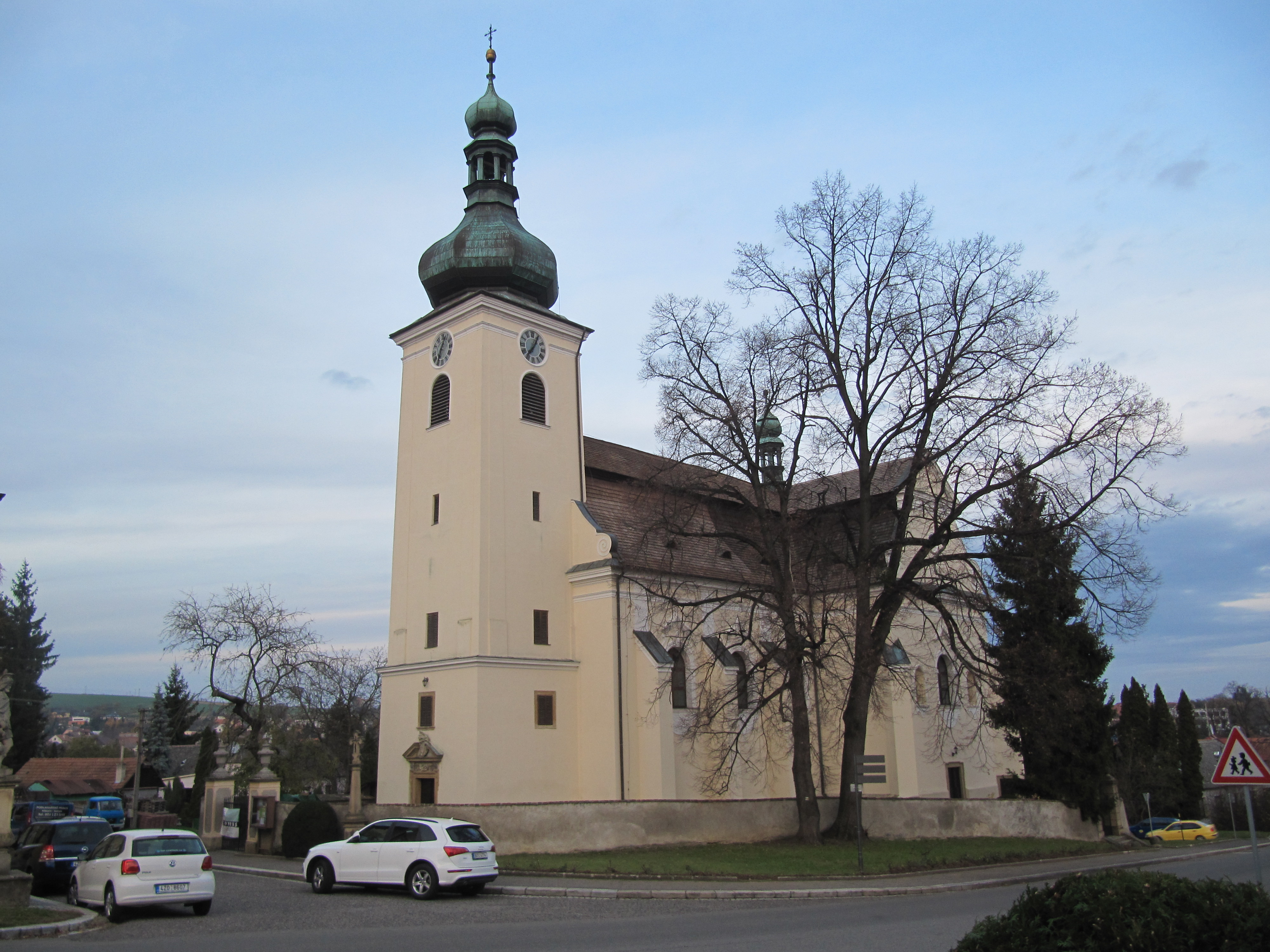
Church of Saint Martin

Buchlovice is known for the castles of Buchlovice and Buchlov. Both have high historical and architectural value and are protected as two national cultural monuments.

Buchlov Castle is located on the eponymous hill above the market town. It was founded in the first half of the 13th century and gradually built in the 13th–18th centuries. Today the castle is owned by the state. It is open to the public and offers guided tours. The protected area of the castle also includes the Chapel of Saint Barbara, situated on the neighbouring hill Modla. It was built in the early Baroque style in 1672–1673.

Buchlovice Castle is located in the centre of the market town. It was built in the Baroque style at the beginning of the 18th century, in the style of Baroque Italian villas. It is surrounded by a large park and gardens. The castle is also owned by the state and offers guided tours for the public.

Among the notable buildings is the Church of Saint Martin. It is an early Baroque building from the mid-17th century, modified at the beginning of the 20th century.

== Notable people ==
- Friedrich von Berchtold (1781–1876), Austrian botanist; died here
- Jiří Hanák (1938–2020), journalist and editor
