= Vřesovice =

Vřesovice may refer to places in the Czech Republic:

- Vřesovice (Hodonín District), a municipality and village in the South Bohemian Region
- Vřesovice (Prostějov District), a municipality and village in the Olomouc Region
