= Halenkovice =

- Municipality
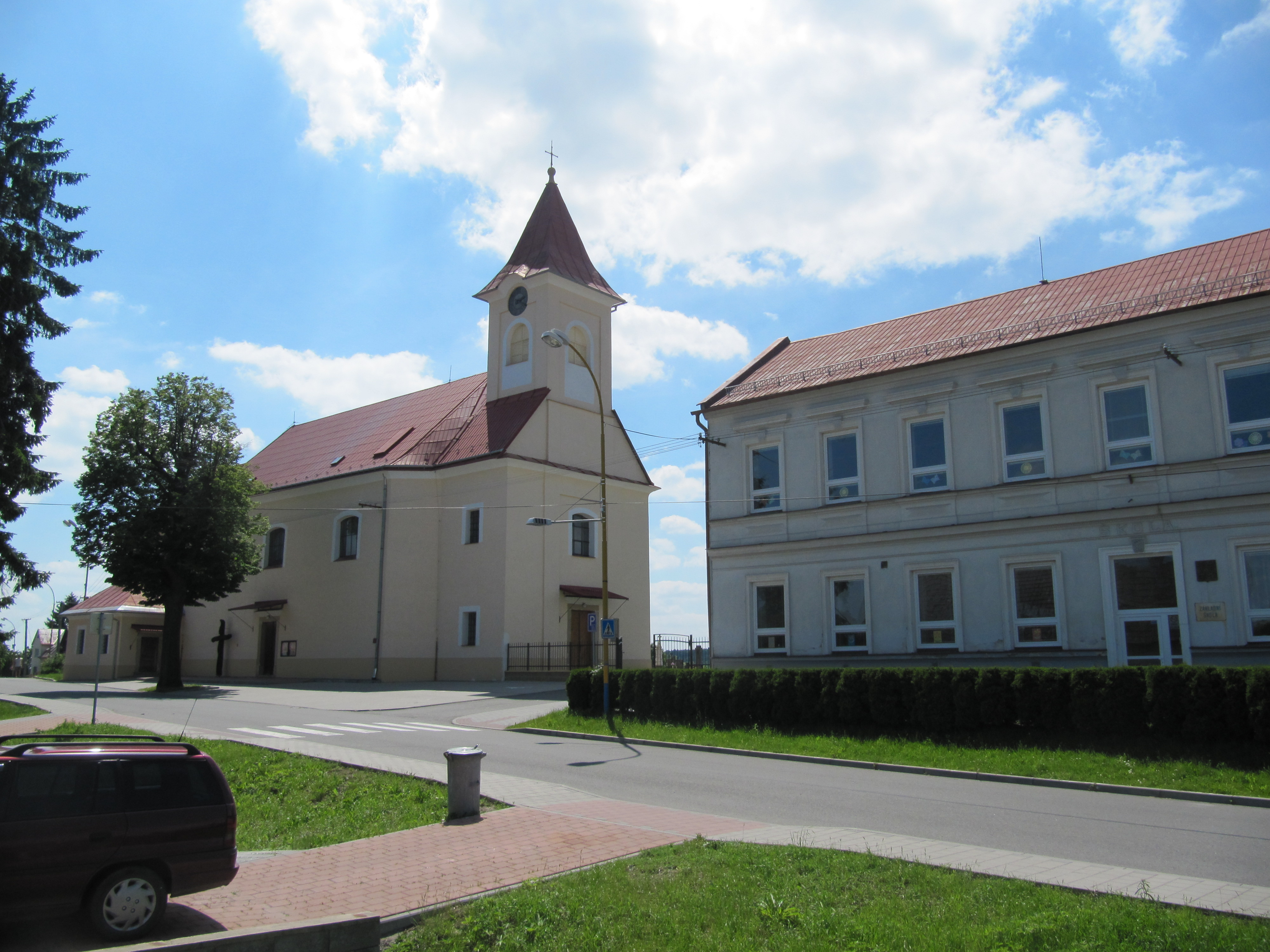
- Church of Saint Joseph and old school

- Flag Coat of arms

- Location in the Czech Republic
- Coordinates: 49°10′16″N 17°28′18″E
- Country: Czech Republic
- Region: Zlín
- District: Zlín
- First mentioned: 1634

Area
  - Total: 20.01 km^{2} (7.73 sq mi)
- Elevation: 288 m (945 ft)

Population (2026-01-01)
  - Total: 2,038
  - Density: 101.8/km^{2} (263.8/sq mi)
- Time zone: UTC+1 (CET)
  - Summer (DST): UTC+2 (CEST)
- Postal code: 763 63
- Website: www.halenkovice.cz

Halenkovice (German: Allenkowitz) is a municipality and village in Zlín District in the Zlín Region of the Czech Republic. It has about 2,000 inhabitants.

== Etymology ==
The initial name of the village was Alenkovice. It was named after Alena, who was the first wife of the founder of the village.

== Geography ==
Halenkovice is located about 14 kilometres (9 mi) southwest of Zlín. It lies in the Chřiby range. The highest point is the hill Březová at 411 m (1,348 ft) above sea level. The Vrbka Stream flows through the municipality.

== History ==
The first written mention of Halenkovice is from 1634. It was founded by the noble Jan of Rottal, probably in the same year.

== Demographics ==
Historical population

Year	Pop.	±%
1869	1,619	—
1880	1,750	+8.1%
1890	1,877	+7.3%
1900	1,950	+3.9%
1910	1,986	+1.8%

Year	Pop.	±%
1921	2,058	+3.6%
1930	2,019	−1.9%
1950	2,131	+5.5%
1961	2,280	+7.0%
1970	2,039	−10.6%

Year	Pop.	±%
1980	1,802	−11.6%
1991	1,634	−9.3%
2001	1,650	+1.0%
2011	1,758	+6.5%
2021	1,908	+8.5%

Source: Censuses

== Transport ==
There are no railways or major roads passing through the municipality.

== Sights ==
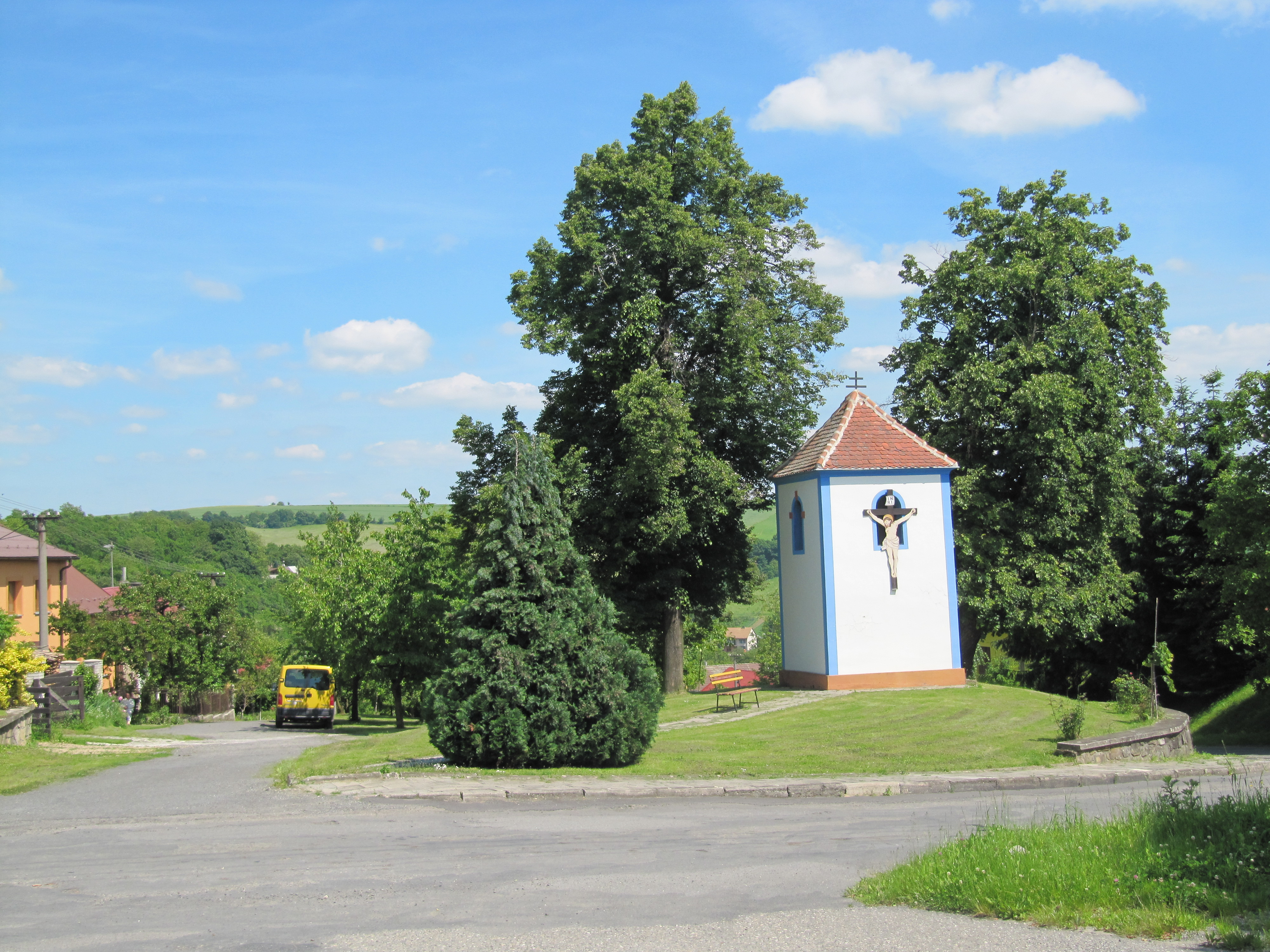
Belfry

Among the protected cultural monuments are a belfry from 1755 with the Chapel of the Virgin Mary on the ground floor, and statues of Saints Peter and Paul from the first half of the 18th century.

The main landmark of Halenkovice is the Church of Saint Joseph. It was built in 1789.
