= Jiří Hanák =

Czech publicist and writer (1938–2020)

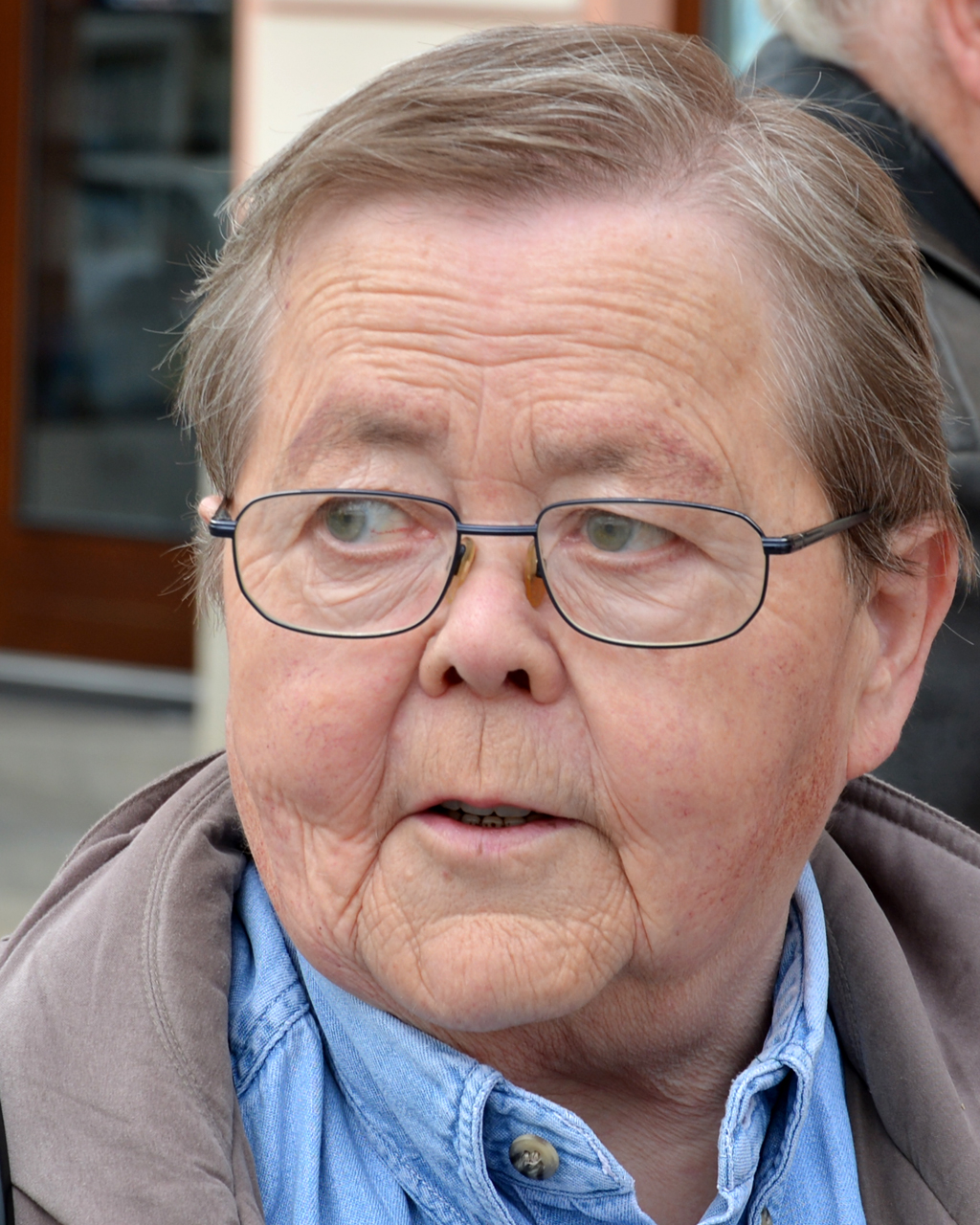
Jiří Hanák in 2016

Jiří Hanák (27 February 1938 – 5 June 2020) was a Czech journalist, editor, political activist, and Charter 77 signatory. He was a longtime columnist and writer for various Czech and Czechoslovak newspapers and magazines. He was a recipient of the Ferdinand Peroutka Award in 2005 and the Opus Vitae Award in 2010.

Born on 27 February 1938 in Buchlovice, Czechoslovakia, Hanák graduated from the Faculty of Arts, Charles University in Prague. After graduation, he became the editor of Reporter magazine in 1967. However, he was fired from the publication in 1969 following the Warsaw Pact invasion of Czechoslovakia. He was banned from working in journalism and forced to work menial jobs during the Normalization period in the 1970s and 1980s.

Jiří Hanák became an early signatory of Charter 77 civic initiative in 1977. In 1988, Hanak began writing for the samizdat newspaper, Lidové noviny. He remained with the Lidové noviny following the Velvet Revolution and the newspaper's legalization.

Hanák helped found and launch the Czech magazine, Týden, in 1994. He also served as editor-in-chief of the now defunct Svobodné slovo newspaper and a commentator and columnist in Právo. In 2016, Jiří Hanák returned to work at Lidové noviny.

Jiří Hanák died in his sleep on 5 June 2020, at the age of 82, following a short illness.
