= Buchlovice Castle =

Coordinates: 49.083°N 17.339°E

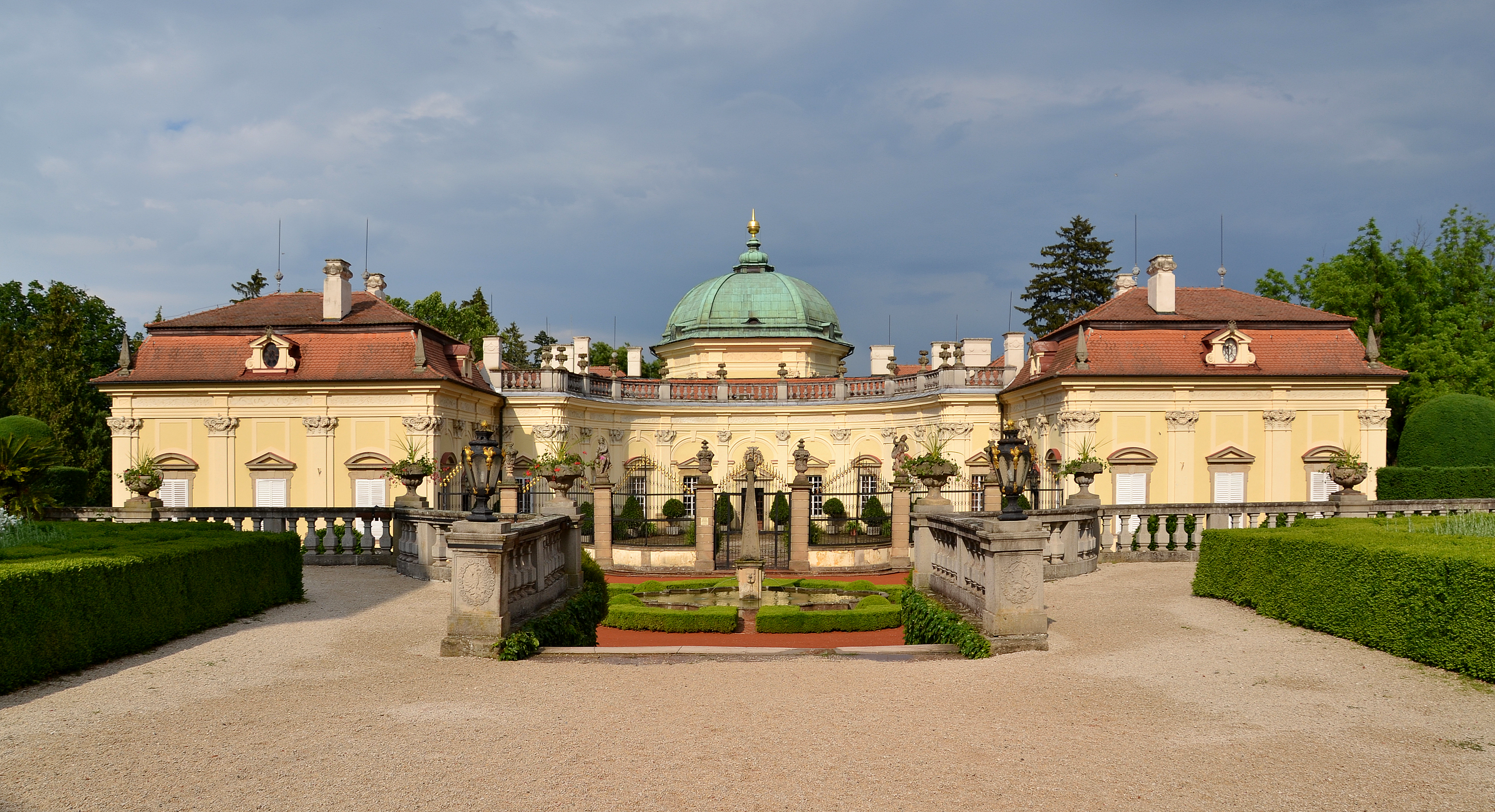
Buchlovice Chateau

Buchlovice Castle (Czech: Zámek Buchlovice) is a chateau in Buchlovice in the Zlín Region of the Czech Republic. Its history is closely connected with nearby Buchlov Castle which grew more and more uncomfortable in the late 17th century, and that is why Jan Dětřich of Petřwald decided to build a new castle. Buchlovice Castle was built as a copy of an Italian villa in baroque style, by Domenico Martinelli. It is one of the most romantic buildings in this country. In 1800 it became property of the Berchtolds, and since 1945 the state castle is open to the public.

== History ==
The area around Buchlovice was inhabited as early as the Stone Age, and the first written records of this district date from 1270. In 1540 Buchlovice became part of the estate of nearby Buchlov Castle. This medieval fortress, which did not meet the increasing demands for a comfortable and prestigious residence, ceased to suit its owners, who decided at the beginning of the 18th century to replace it with the grandiose castle in Buchlovice. Jan Dětrích of Petřvald had the castle built according to the proposals of Italian architect Domenico Martinelli between 1707 and 1738.

The castle complex is made up of the ceremonial building known as the Dolní zámek (Lower Château), and the building known as Horní zámek (Upper Château), which had a service function. A courtyard of honour extends between the two. Around the castle an Italian-style park was created, which was extended and altered in the English style in the first half of the 19th century and is among the most valuable of its kind in the Czech Republic.

The heiress Theresia, Baroness Petřvaldský of Petřvald (1727-1768) married Count Posper Anton Berchtold von Ungarschitz (1720-1807). The estate remained the property of the Counts von Berchtold from 1763 until expropriation by Czechoslovakia after 2nd World War in 1945. They extended the formal gardens with an English landscape garden of 18 hectares.

In 1807, during the Napoleonic Wars, Leopold I Berchtold established a military hospital in part of the castle and a drapery in the stables. On September 16, 1908, in the run-up to the Bosnian Crisis, Count Leopold II Berchtold, ambassador of Austria-Hungary in Saint Petersburg, hosted the meeting between Russian Foreign Minister Alexander Izvolsky and Austro-Hungarian Foreign Minister Count Alois Lexa von Aehrenthal in his castle. Austria-Hungary and Russia agreed on the controversial Buchlau Agreement, according to which Austria-Hungary should receive Bosnia-Herzegovina and would, in return, support Russia in the attempt to enforce extended rights of passage through the Dardanelles against the Ottoman Empire.

The castle is open to the public and visitors can admire the state rooms, and chambers with rich stucco work and painted ceilings.

== See also ==
- List of castles in the South Moravian Region

== Gallery ==
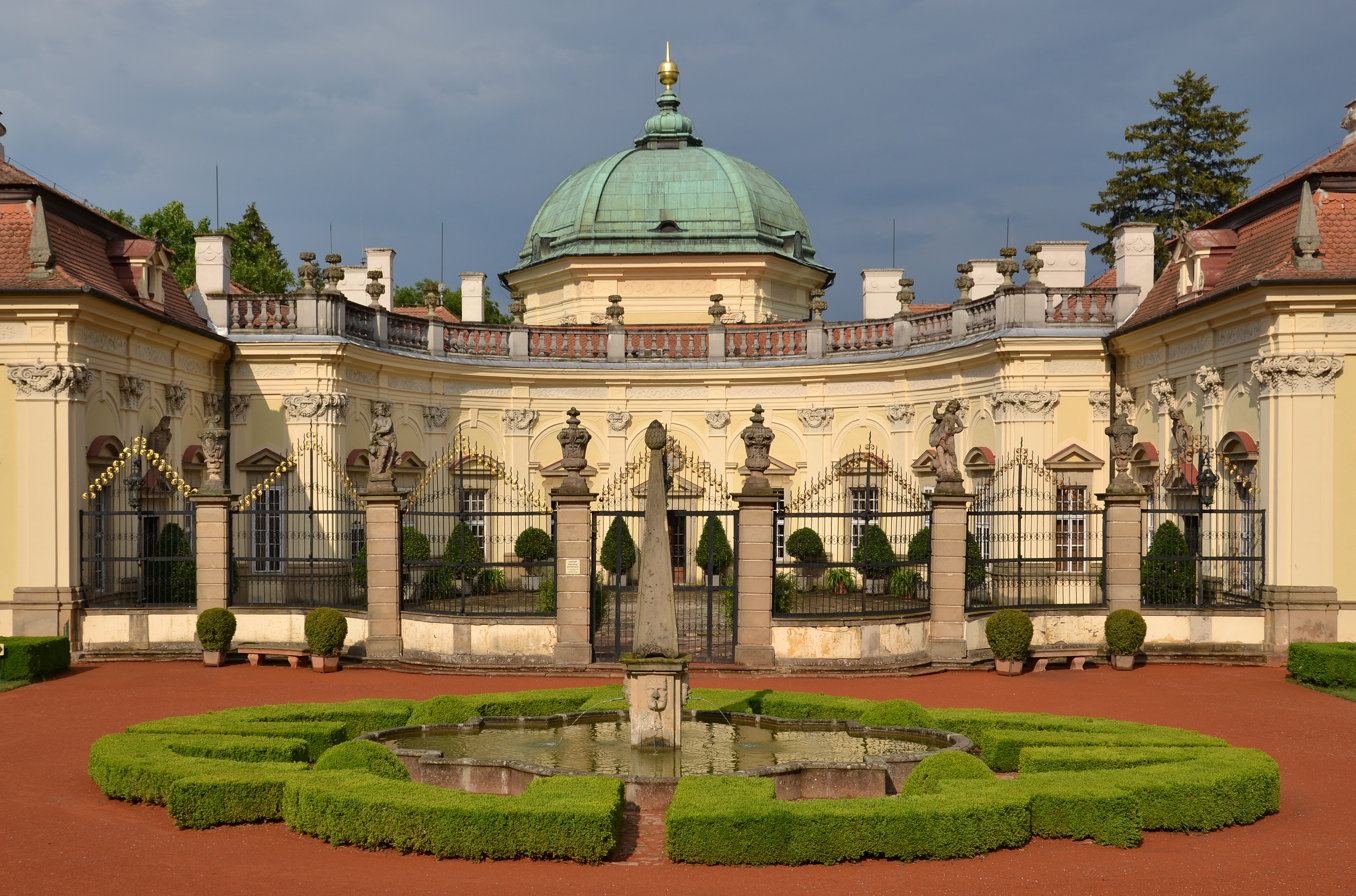

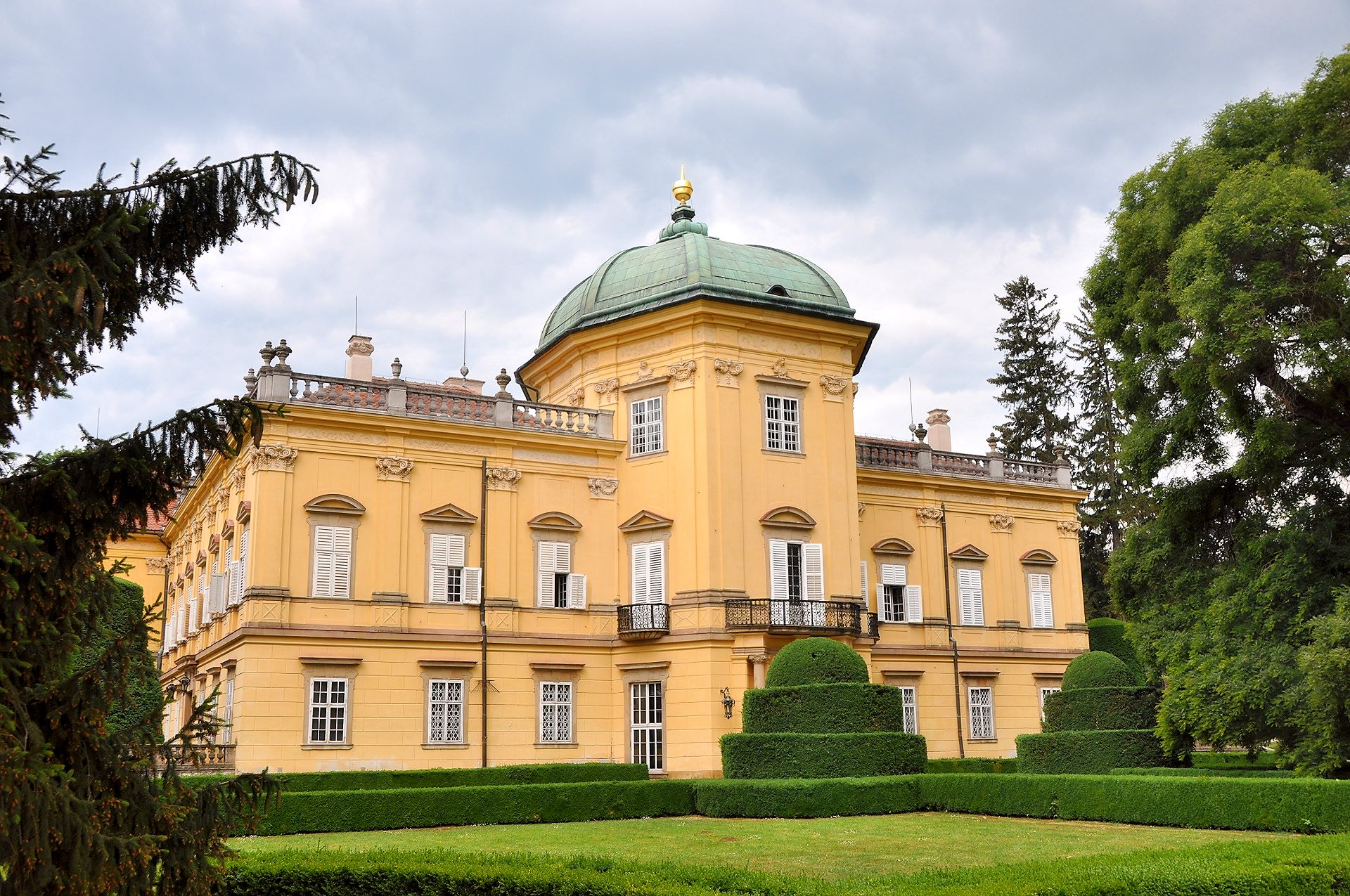

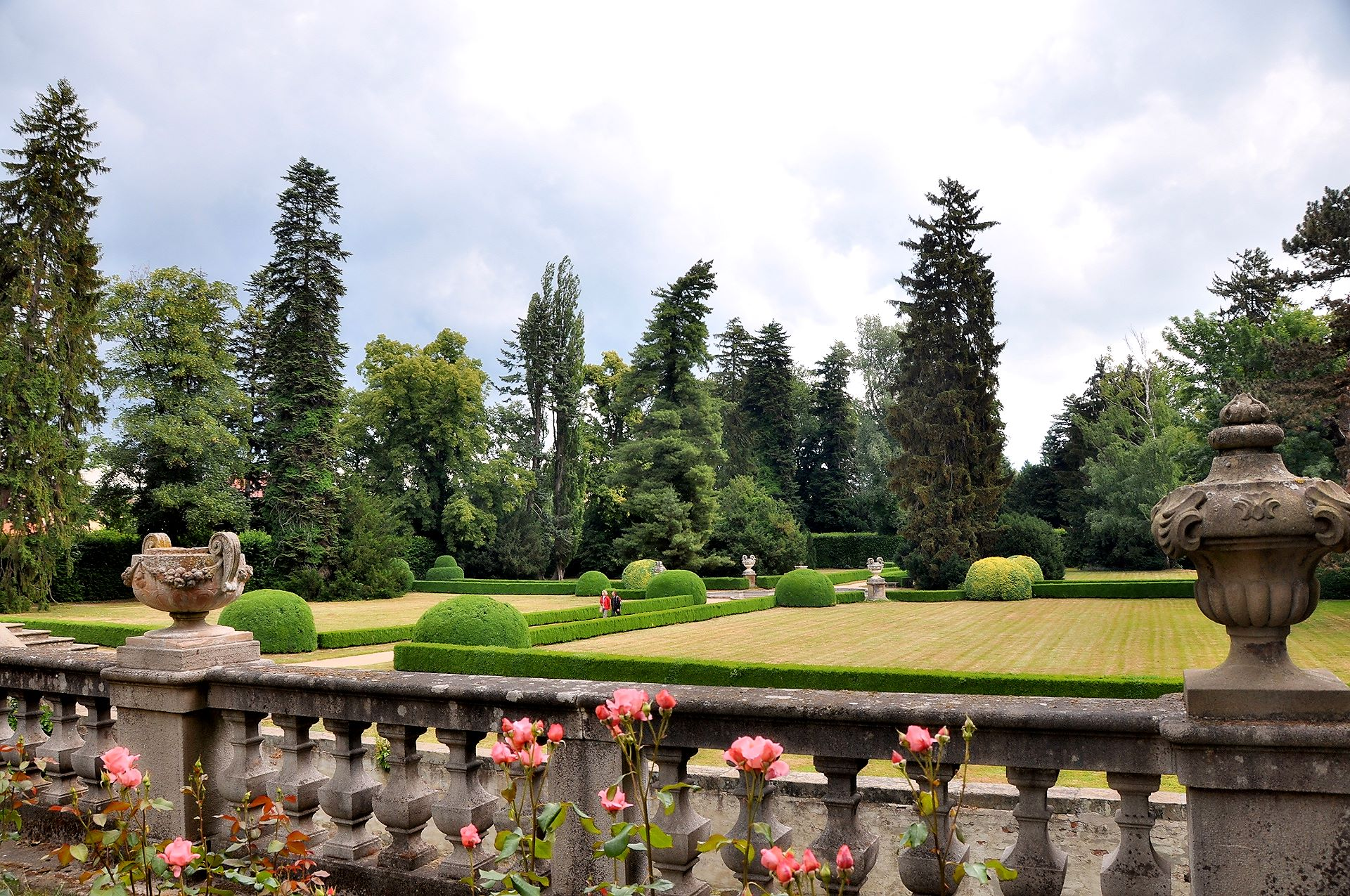
Formal Garden

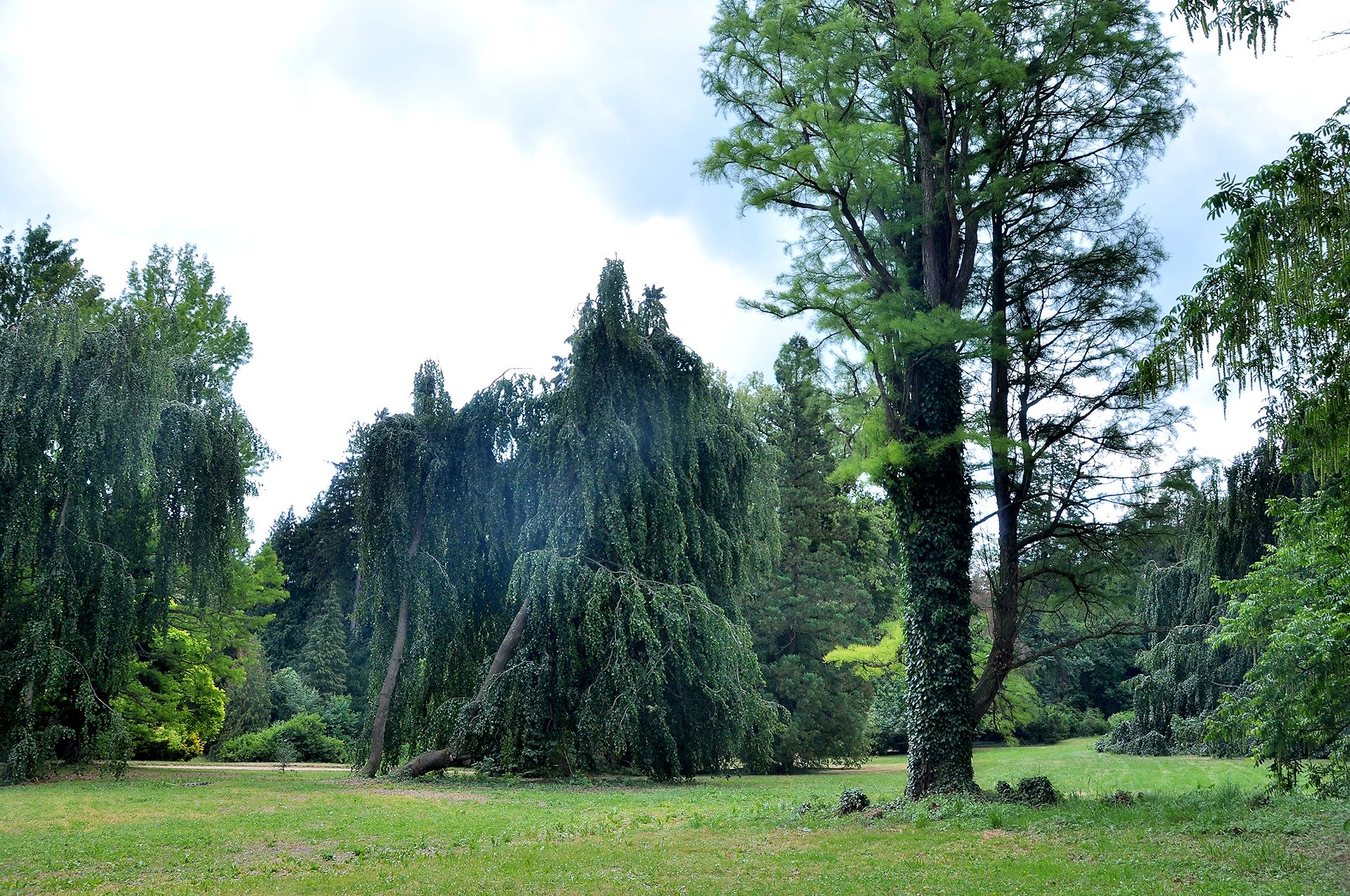
English Garden

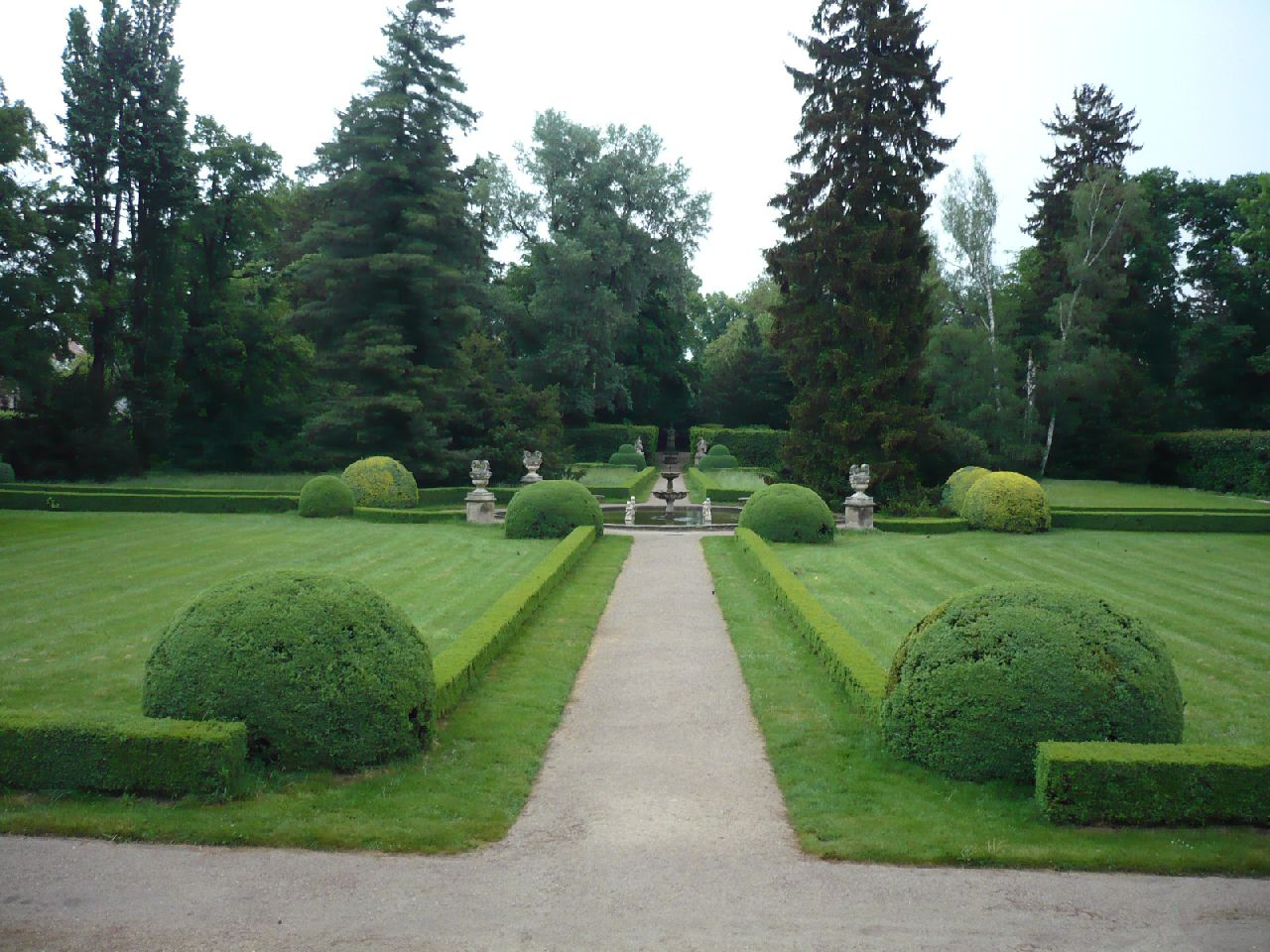
