= Bosnian Crisis =

Crisis triggered by Austria-Hungary's annexation of Bosnia and Herzegovina in 1908

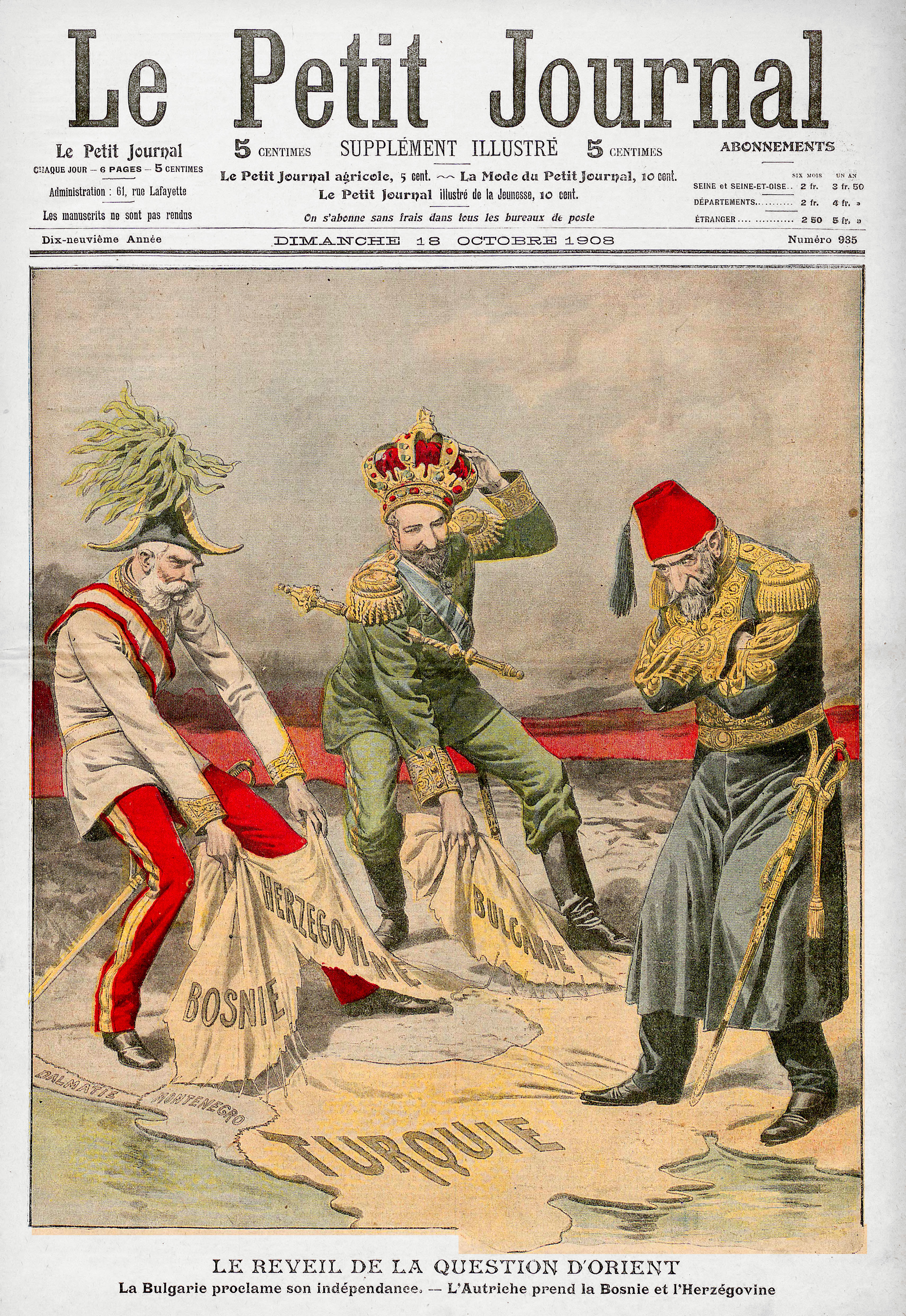
- Cover of the French periodical Le Petit Journal on the Bosnian Crisis: Prince Ferdinand of Bulgaria declares independence and is proclaimed Tsar, and the Austrian Emperor Franz Joseph annexes Bosnia and Herzegovina, while the Ottoman Sultan Abdul Hamid II looks on.
- Date: 5 October 1908 – April 1909
- Location: Europe
- Also known as: Annexation Crisis; First Balkan Crisis
- Cause: Annexation of Bosnia and Herzegovina by Austria-Hungary.
- Outcome: Amendment to the Treaty of Berlin; permanent damage to relations between Austria-Hungary and its neighbors

The Bosnian Crisis (German: Bosnische Annexionskrise, Turkish: Bosna Krizi), also known as the Annexation Crisis (Serbo-Croatian: Aneksiona kriza, Анексиона криза) or the First Balkan Crisis, erupted on 5 October 1908 when Austria-Hungary announced the annexation of Bosnia and Herzegovina, (Note: Sources vary as to the exact date of the annexation. It is reported as having taken place on 4, 5, or 6 October.) territories formerly within the sovereignty of the Ottoman Empire but under Austro-Hungarian administration since 1878.

This unilateral action – timed to coincide with Bulgaria's declaration of independence from the Ottoman Empire on 5 October – sparked protestations from all the Great Powers and Austria-Hungary's Balkan neighbors, Serbia and Montenegro. In April 1909, the Treaty of Berlin was amended to reflect the fait accompli and bring the crisis to an end. Although the crisis ended with what appeared to be a total Austro-Hungarian diplomatic victory, it permanently damaged relations between Austria-Hungary and its neighbors, especially Serbia, Italy and Russia, and in the long term helped lay the grounds for World War I. Austro-Serbian relations – harmed by the annexation's inflaming of Serbian nationalists – continued to be strained to the point of declaring war on each other in 1914.

== Background ==
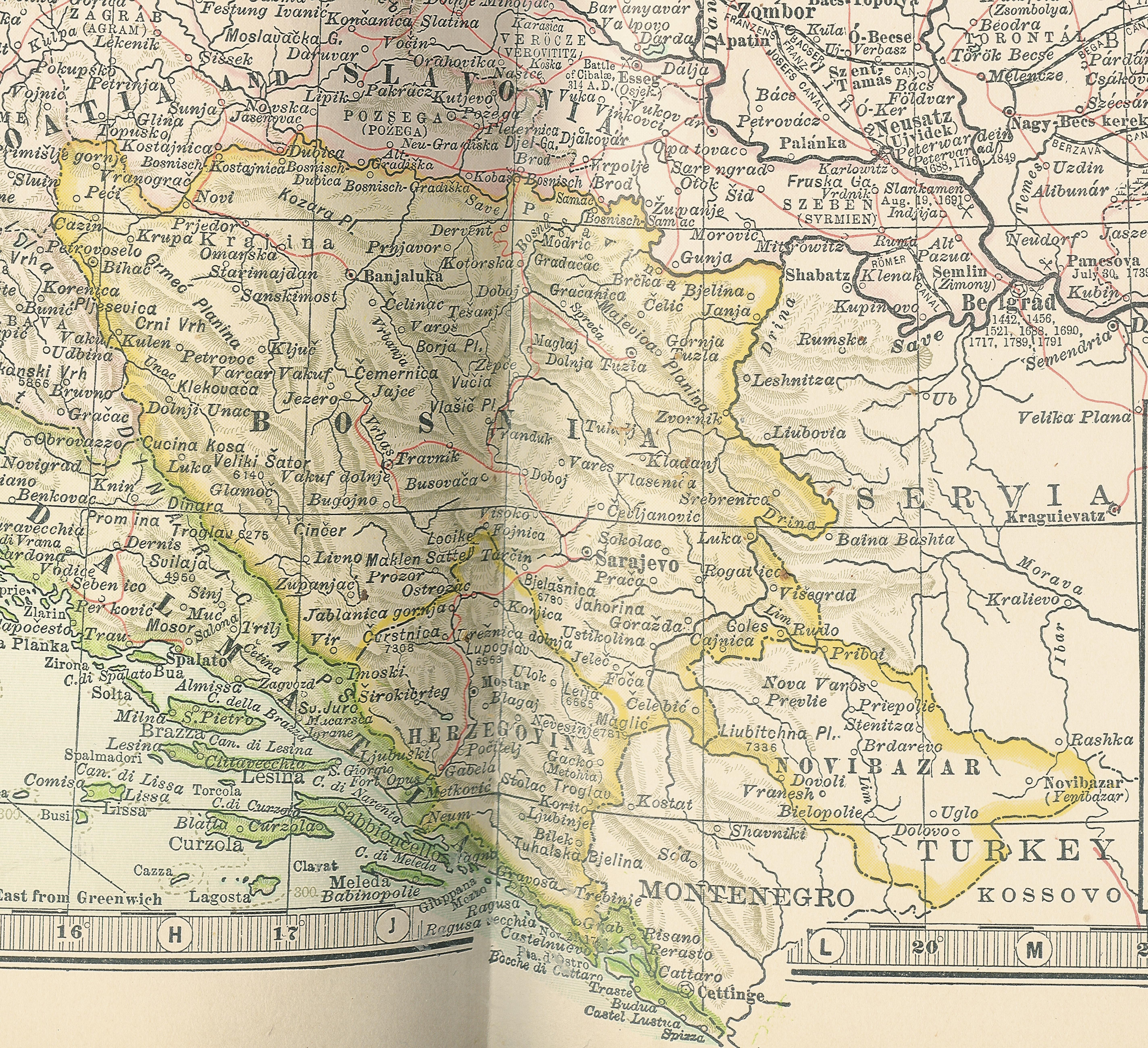
Bosnia-Herzegovina and the Sanjak of Novi Pazar

The mid-1870s witnessed a series of violent rebellions against Ottoman rule in the Balkans, and equally violent and repressive responses from the Ottoman Empire. The Russian Tsar, Alexander II, wanting to intervene against the Ottomans, wanted and obtained an agreement with Austria-Hungary. In the Budapest Conventions of 1877, the two powers agreed that Russia would annex Bessarabia, and Austria-Hungary would observe a benevolent neutrality toward Russia in the pending war with the Ottoman Empire. As compensation for this support, Russia agreed to Austria-Hungary's control over Bosnia-Herzegovina.

Shortly thereafter, the Russians declared war, and, after a few setbacks, drove the Ottomans relentlessly back to within a few miles of Constantinople. What stopped the Russians from driving the Ottomans completely out of Europe was the willingness of the other great powers, particularly Britain and Austria-Hungary, to enforce an earlier treaty, the London Straits Convention of 1841, which stated that the Straits of Constantinople would be closed to warships during time of war. This had the effect of bottling up the Russian fleet in the Black Sea, but would be worthless if Russian troops gained control of the straits by land. After their victory in the war, the Russians then imposed the Treaty of San Stefano on the Ottomans, which, in part, reneged on pledges made in the Budapest Convention and declared that Bosnia-Herzegovina would be jointly occupied by Russian and Austrian troops.

Austrian-occupied Bosnia-Herzegovina and the Sanjak of Novi Pazar in 1904

The Treaty of San Stefano was overturned by the 1878 Treaty of Berlin. Under article 29, Austria-Hungary received special rights in the Ottoman Empire's provinces of Bosnia-Herzegovina and the Sanjak of Novi Pazar. Article 25 stated that "The provinces of Bosnia and Herzegovina shall be occupied and administered by Austria-Hungary" and continued "Austria-Hungary reserves the right to maintain garrisons and to have military and trading roads over the whole area of that portion the Sanjak of Novi Pazar of the ancient Vilayet of Bosnia."

The Bosniak-dominated Sanjak of Novi Pazar separated Montenegro from Serbia and prevented the geographic and political union of these two states which were often closely aligned. The Austrian occupation of the Sanjak was also significant because it provided Austria-Hungary with a staging area for possible future expansion towards the Aegean port of Salonika in Ottoman-controlled Macedonia.

Austria-Hungary exercised its legal rights, taking firm control of Bosnia-Herzegovina and jointly occupying the Sanjak of Novi Pazar together with the Ottoman Empire. The Treaty of Berlin allowed for sole Austrian occupation of Bosnia-Herzegovina, but did not specify a final disposition of the provinces. This omission was addressed in the Three Emperors' League treaty of 1881, where both Germany and Russia endorsed Austria's right to annex Bosnia-Herzegovina. A bilateral commercial treaty between Austria and Serbia in the same year had a secret annexe, stating that "Serbia 'would not permit any political, religious or other intrigue to be directed from her territory against the Austro-Hungarian monarchy, including Bosnia, Herzegovina and the Sanjak of Novi Pazar'". However, by 1897, under the new Tsar, Nicholas II, the Russian Imperial government had managed, again, to withdraw its support for Austrian annexation of Bosnia-Herzegovina. The Russian Foreign Minister, Count Michael Muraviev, stated that an Austrian annexation of Bosnia-Herzegovina would raise "an extensive question requiring special scrutiny". Serbia allowed their obligations under the commercial treaty of 1881 to lapse in 1899.

In 1903 King Alexander Obrenovic of Serbia was assassinated in a coup and the pro-Russian Karađorđević dynasty came to the throne. Power shifted to elements widely interested in expansion into Bosnia. The new Serbian government wanted to take over the Sanjak of Novi Pazar and Bosnia-Herzegovina from the Austro-Hungarians. Relations between Serbia and Austria-Hungary gradually deteriorated. However, Russia's ability to support Serbia was greatly reduced following military humiliation in the 1905 Russo-Japanese War and the ensuing internal unrest.

By 1907, Austro-Hungarian Foreign Minister Alois Aehrenthal began formulating a plan to solidify Austria-Hungary's position towards Serbia through annexation of Bosnia-Herzegovina. His opportunity came in the form of a letter from Russian Foreign Minister Alexander Izvolsky – proposing Austrian annexation of the provinces as part of a deal to secure better access to the Turkish Straits for Russian naval vessels – and a subsequent meeting at Buchlau castle in Moravia, Austria-Hungary.

== Buchlau bargain ==
Under the Treaty of Berlin, the Ottomans controlled the Dardanelles strait connecting the Mediterranean and the Black Sea. The Treaty prohibited the passage of any warships from any country into or out of the Black Sea. This treaty bottled up the Black Sea Fleet, a major portion of the Russian Navy, making it useless in the Russo-Japanese War of 1904-1905 when it was urgently needed. Izvolsky wanted this changed to allow the passage of Russian ships through the straits. Aehrenthal wanted full control of Bosnia-Herzegovina. Austria-Hungary had administered the provinces since 1878 but the Ottoman Empire remained the nominal legal owner. Aehrenthal concocted a grand diplomatic deal that proposed major benefits for both sides. Austria would gain full ownership of Bosnia with Russian approval. The Ottomans would regain full control of the territory known as the Sanjak of Novi Pazar, and monetary compensation. Russia would get the right of passage for its warships through the Straits. Serbia would get nothing.

Before approaching the Russians, Aehrenthal met with Austrian officials and won the approval of Emperor Franz Joseph I. On September 15–16 Aehrenthal and Izvolsky held a secret meeting. No record was kept – and afterwards both sides remembered it very differently. Aehrenthal assumed he had full Russian approval for his scheme, but he did not give out planned dates. Izvolsky assumed he would be informed before any actual move happened. Aehrenthal vaguely informed all the major countries but gave no details. The world was astonished on October 6, 1908, when a press release in Vienna announced that Bosnia was fully annexed. Inside Austria there was general approval except in Czech areas – that minority strongly felt its demands had been deliberately ignored.

Aehrenthal had expected wide European approval and instead he faced a hostile volcanic eruption from every direction. Izvolsky vehemently denounced the action and demanded an international conference on Bosnia. After decades of low-level activity, pan-Slavic forces inside Russia mobilized in opposition. Mass demonstrations broke out across the continent. Rome took advantage of the situation by reversing its friendship with Vienna. Berlin officials were surprised and appalled. The British were especially angry, denouncing the violation of an international agreement signed by both Austria and Britain. France denounced the scheme. The Ottomans were surprised by the unexpected development, but was quieted by the cash payment. By far the angriest reaction came from Serbia, which called for revenge, and began setting up secret guerrilla bands, plotting insurrection and other clandestine activities in the annexed Bosnia and its capital, Sarajevo.

All across Europe the chief blame was placed on Berlin, not Vienna. Europeans feared the powerful German army and took the episode as proof of its expansionist intentions. Berlin now realized it stood alone, with Austria its only friend. It decided it would firmly support Austria despite doubts about the wisdom of annexing Bosnia; Berlin explicitly warned St Petersburg that continued demands for an international conference constituted a hostile action and increased the risk of war with Germany. Russia backed down. Thanks to the German intervention, Austria achieved short-term diplomatic success in taking control of Bosnia. In the long run, however, Germany and Austria both made too many enemies, as the battle lines of World War I started to harden.

=== Exchange of letters ===
On 2 July 1908, Russian Foreign Minister Alexander Izvolsky sent a letter to Austro-Hungarian Foreign Minister Alois Aehrenthal and proposed a discussion of reciprocal changes to the Treaty of Berlin in favour of the Russian interest in the Straits of Constantinople and Austro-Hungarian interests in the annexation of Bosnia-Herzegovina and the Sanjak of Novi Pazar. On 14 July Aehrenthal responded with guarded acceptance of the proposed discussions. On 10 September, after long and complex discussions within the Imperial Government discussing the Izvolsky proposals to Austria-Hungary, Aehrenthal outlined a slightly different set of counter-proposals to him: he proposed that in exchange for a friendly Russian attitude when Austria-Hungary annexed Bosnia-Herzegovina, Austria-Hungary would then withdraw its troops from the Sanjak. The letter then went on to offer to discuss, as a separate matter, the Straits question, on a friendly basis. Aehrenthal proposed that should agreement on Bosnia-Herzegovina be reached, his Government would not – should the Russians subsequently propose to assert a right of their Black Sea fleet to both use and protect their access to the Mediterranean through the Bosporus – automatically decide with the other powers to support collectively the Ottoman Empire's opposition (up to and including war) to such a proposal.

=== Meeting at Buchlau ===
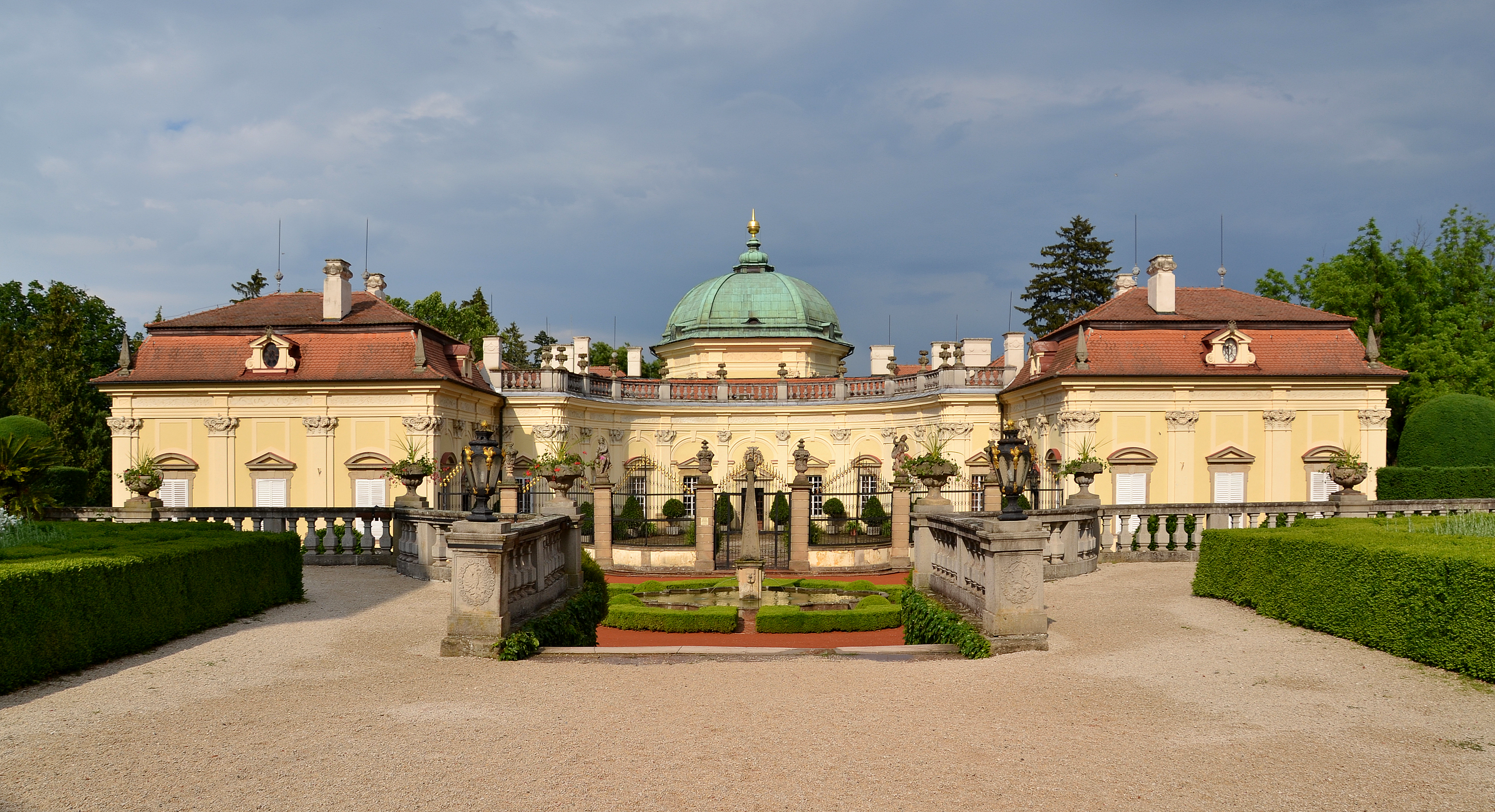
Buchlovice (Buchlau) Castle

On 16 September, Izvolsky and Aehrenthal met face-to-face at Buchlau Castle in Moravia, the private residence of Count Leopold Berchtold, ambassador of Austria-Hungary in Saint Petersburg. No minutes were taken during these private meetings, which lasted a total of six hours. Izvolsky accepted the responsibility to write up the conclusions of the meetings and forward them to Aehrenthal. On 21 September, Aehrenthal wrote to Izvolsky asking for this document, to which Izvolsky replied two days later that the document had been sent to the Czar for approval. This document, if it ever existed, has never been produced.

=== Aehrenthal's version of the agreement ===
By Aehrenthal's account given by Albertini, Izvolsky agreed that Russia would maintain "a friendly and benevolent attitude" if Austria-Hungary were to annex Bosnia-Herzegovina. Reciprocally, should Russia move to open "the Straits to single ships of war", Austria-Hungary would maintain a benevolent attitude. The two agreed that a likely consequence of the annexation was that Bulgaria, which was de facto independent since 1878, would declare its formal independence from the Ottoman Empire. Austria-Hungary would offer no territorial concessions to Serbia or Montenegro, but if they supported the annexation then Austria-Hungary would not oppose Serbian expansion in the Balkans, and would support the Russian demand to revise Article 29 of the Treaty of Berlin which restricted Montenegrin sovereignty. The parties agreed that "these changes could receive sanction after negotiation with the Porte and the Powers", but "there would be no more talk of Bosnia-Herzegovina." Annexation would probably take place at the beginning of October. The original of Aehrenthal's account has not been found and so historians have had to make do with an undated office copy of the document.

=== Izvolsky's version ===
On 30 September, Austria-Hungary informed Izvolsky, who was in Paris at the time, that the annexation would take place on 7 October. On 4 October, Izvolsky prepared a report at the request of the British Ambassador to France, Francis Bertie. Izvolsky stated that his position was that annexation was a matter to be settled between the signatories to the Treaty of Berlin. With the compensation of Austro-Hungarian withdrawal from the Sanjak of Novi Pazar, Russia would not consider the annexation as reason to go to war, but Russia and other governments would insist on changes to the Treaty favorable to themselves, including opening the Straits (Russia's interest), Bulgarian independence, territorial concessions to Serbia, and abolition of restrictions on Montenegrin sovereignty under article 29.

== Annexation ==
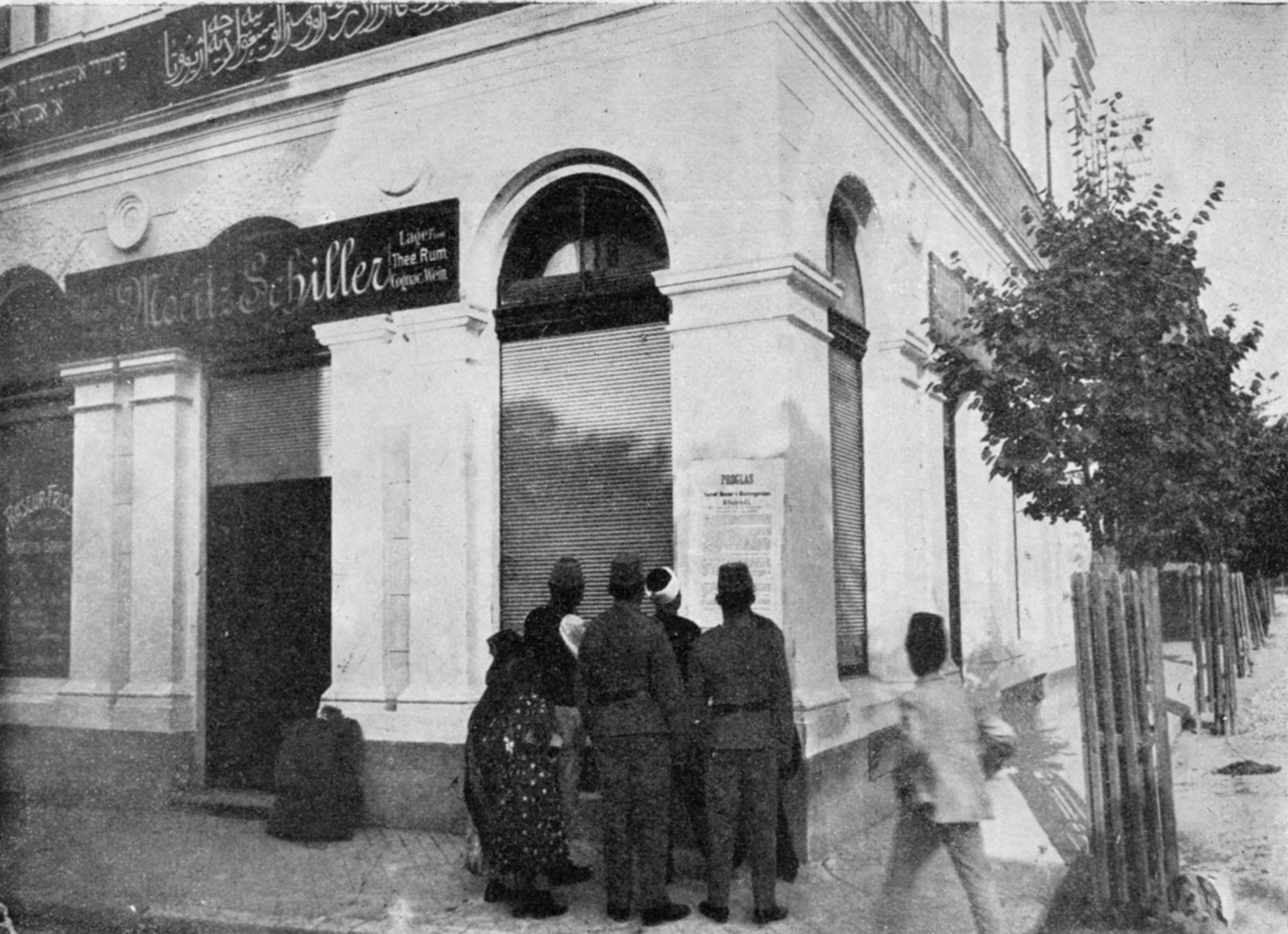
Sarajevo citizens reading a poster with the proclamation of the annexation at the location where Gavrilo Princip stood 1908.

Bosnia and Herzegovina within Austria-Hungary

On 6 October, the day after Bulgaria declared its independence from the Ottoman Empire, Emperor Franz Joseph announced to the people of this Ottoman territory (that had been occupied by Austria for 30 years) his determination to recognize and grant them an autonomous and constitutional regime, under his authority as their annexing sovereign. The following day, Austria-Hungary announced its withdrawal from the Sanjak of Novi Pazar. Bulgarian independence and the Bosnian annexation were not covered by the Treaty of Berlin and set off a flurry of diplomatic protests and discussions.

== Protests and compensations ==
Serbia mobilized its army and on 7 October the Serbian Crown Council demanded that the annexation be reversed or, failing that, Serbia should receive compensation, which it defined on 25 October as a strip of land across the northernmost portion of the Sanjak of Novi Pazar. In the end these demands were rejected. Serbia took control of the Sanjak after the Balkan Wars.

=== The Ottoman embargo ===
The Ottoman Empire protested Bulgaria's declaration of independence with more vigor than the annexation of Bosnia-Herzegovina, which it had no practical prospects of governing. On 5 October 1908, Hüseyin Cahit Yalçın, publisher of the Tanin newspaper called for a boycott of Austrian goods. The Kamil Pasha government was against the boycott, which slowed the boycott process down. In a single day 5000 new members had joined the boycott organization. In a short period of time, the boycott has reached Egypt. The press was saying that Austria was about to capitulate. Even though Pallavicini made repeated protests, the boycott continued. From 1907 to 1908, the amount of Ottoman imports from Austria-Hungary decreased by 25%. Compared to the fiscal year of 1905-1906, there was a fall by about 11 million dollars, which was 39%. On 26 February, Austria-Hungary settled the matter in a protocol. Austria-Hungary agreed to pay the Ottomans 2.2 million Ottoman lira for the public land in Bosnia-Herzegovina. Overall, the boycott ended up inflicting commercial losses of over 100,000,000 kronen on Austria-Hungary. Even though the boycott was successful economically, neither Bulgarian independence nor the Austrian annexation of Bosnia could be reversed.

=== France, Britain, Russia and Italy ===
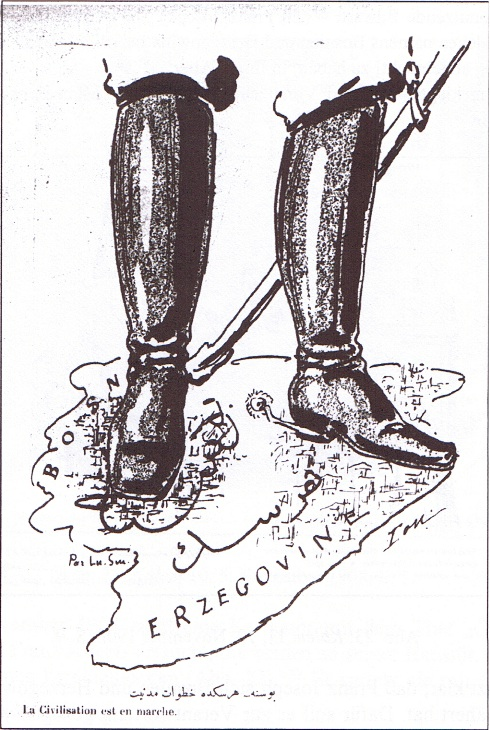
Ottoman caricature on the annexation of Bosnia and Herzegovina, with the ironic title: "Advance of civilization in Bosnia and Herzegovina"

The annexation and Bulgarian declaration were viewed as violations of the Treaty of Berlin. France, Britain, Russia and Italy, therefore, were in favor of a conference to consider the matter. German opposition and complex diplomatic maneuvering as to the location, nature and preconditions of the conference delayed and ultimately scuttled it. Instead, the Powers reached an agreement on amendments to the Treaty through consultations between capitals.

Italy expected compensations in the areas of "Italia Irredenta" ruled by Austria-Hungary in exchange for its recognition of the annexation of Bosnia-Herzegovina, as was agreed upon in the Triple Alliance treaties with Austria-Hungary. However, this did not happen and this became one of the reasons for Italy to break its alliance with Austria-Hungary in 1915. The mutual compensation clause was article 7 of the 1909 and of 5 December 1912 versions of the same treaty:

However, if, in the course of events, the maintenance of the status quo in the regions of the Balkans or of the Ottoman coasts and islands in the Adriatic and in the Aegean Sea should become impossible, and if, whether in consequence of the action of a third Power or otherwise, Austria-Hungary or Italy should find themselves under the necessity of modifying it by a temporary or permanent occupation on their part, this occupation shall take place only after a previous agreement between the two Powers, based upon the principle of reciprocal compensation for every advantage, territorial or other, which each of them might obtain beyond the present status quo, and giving satisfaction to the interests and well-founded claims of the two Parties.

== Russia and Serbia back down ==
British opposition to amending the Treaty of Berlin with respect to the Straits left Russia empty-handed and therefore Izvolsky and the Tsar regarded the annexation and Aehrenthal's maneuvers as made in bad faith. Cognizant of Aehrenthal's rumored Jewish heritage, Izvolsky exploded, remarking "The dirty Jew has deceived me. He lied to me, he bamboozled me, that frightful Jew." To bring Izvolsky to heel, Austria-Hungary threatened to release and then ultimately began leaking documents, in which, over the course of the previous 30 years, Russia had agreed that Austria-Hungary had a free hand to do as it liked with Bosnia-Herzegovina and the Sanjak of Novi Pazar. These documents were an embarrassment to Russia, especially with regard to its relations with Serbia. Tsar Nicholas II wrote to Emperor Franz-Joseph and accused Austria-Hungary of betraying confidence and relations between the two countries were permanently damaged. Under Germany's advice, Austria-Hungary kept in confidence the 2 July and 23 September correspondence from Izvolsky to Aehrenthal and these were a continued threat to Izvolsky's position if Russia did not firmly and publicly accept the amendment of Article 25 of the Treaty of Berlin to accept the annexation. On 22 March, Germany put Russia on the spot, demanding that Russia give a clear and unequivocal "yes" or "no" as to whether it committed to accept this amendment. Failure to give a positive reply would cause Germany to withdraw from the diplomatic discussions "and let things take their course". Under such pressure, Izvolsky caved and advised the cabinet to accept the amendment of Article 25 for fear that otherwise Austria would be free to act against Serbia. The cabinet agreed. On 23 March the Tsar accepted the decision and communicated the decision to the German Ambassador to Russia Pourtalès. Britain, however, was not quite ready to acquiesce and stated that it would do so only once "the Serbian question had been settled in a pacific manner." France fell in line behind Britain.

On 26 March, Austria-Hungary provided Britain with the negotiated text of Serbia's March declaration committing Serbia to accept the annexation. It ran:

Serbia recognizes that she has not been injured in her right by the fait accompli created in Bosnia-Herzegovina and that consequently, she will conform to such decision as the Powers shall take in regard to Article 25 of the Treaty of Berlin. Submitting to the advice of the Great Powers, Serbia undertakes already now to abandon the attitude of protest and opposition which she has maintained in regard to the annexation since last autumn and undertakes further to change the course of her present policy towards Austria-Hungary to live henceforward with the latter on a footing of good-neighbourliness. Conformable to these declarations and confident of the pacific intentions of Austria-Hungary, Serbia will reduce her army to the position of spring 1908 as regards its organization, its distribution and effectiveness. She will disarm and disband her volunteers and bands and will prevent the formation of new units of irregulars on its territories.

The next day Austria-Hungary asked for Britain's firm assurance that once the negotiations with Serbia were complete, Britain would accept the amendment of Article 25. Without such assurance Austria-Hungary stated it would break off negotiations with Serbia. Later that day Austria-Hungary decided to partially mobilize its armed forces. On 28 March Britain committed as requested. On 31 March Serbia made its formal declaration of acceptance to Austria-Hungary representing a complete Serbian climb down. The crisis was over. The Great Powers signed the amendments to the Treaty of Berlin in the various capitals from 7 to 19 April.

A little over a year later, as a result of this diplomatic defeat, Izvolsky was demoted and made ambassador to France. He was permanently embittered against Aehrenthal and the Central Powers. The Russian diplomat and newspaperman de Schelking relates Izvolsky's political downfall: "In the Salons of Petrograd he was given the Sobriquet 'Prince of the Bosphorus'. In his conceit, Izvolsky could not see he was being mocked."
