= Oldřich Pechal =

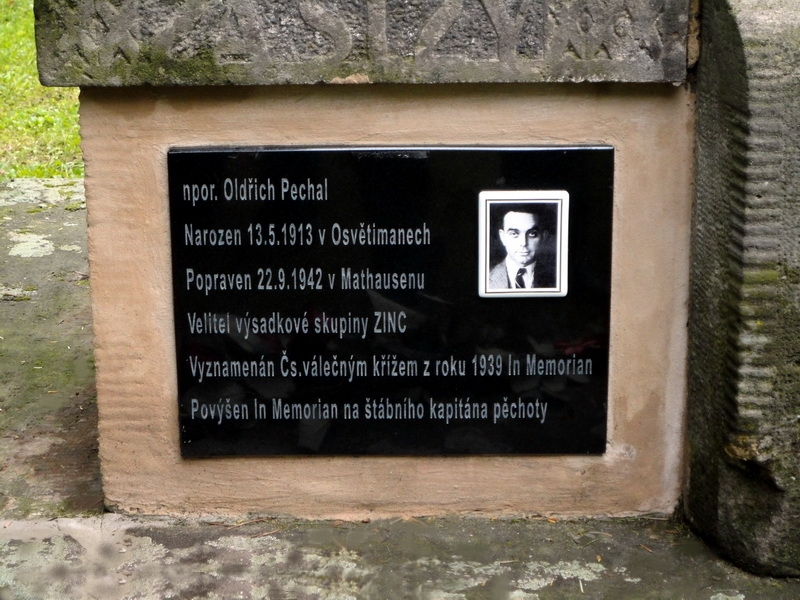
- Memorial granite plaque in Osvětimany dedicated to the memory of Oldřich Pechal
- Born: 13 May 1913; Osvětimany, Austria-Hungary
- Died: 22 September 1942 (aged 29); Mauthausen, Austria
- Military career
- Allegiance: Czech Resistance movement
- Rank: First Lieutenant
- Conflicts: World War II

Oldřich Pechal (13 May 1913 – 22 September 1942) was a Czech soldier. He served as a soldier in World War II, fighting in the Czechoslovak and British armies against Nazi Germany. He was captured following a failed operation in 1942, and was executed in Mauthausen concentration camp that same year. Pechal is considered a national hero of the Czech Republic.

== Biography ==
Pechal was born on 13 May 1913 in Osvětimany, then part of Austria-Hungary. His father was a forester, and Pechal spent much of his time in Vřesovice. He also developed a reputation for his athletic ability. After graduating from grammar school, Pechal enlisted in the Czechoslovak army in 1934.

Following the outbreak of World War II and the subsequent occupation of Czechoslovakia by the German army, Pechal fled to France to continue the fight against the Germans. In France he joined the French Foreign Legion, but did not see combat before the Fall of France caused him to be evacuated to the United Kingdom. In the UK, Pechal underwent paratrooper and cryptography training in Scotland in preparation for a mission inside Czechoslovakia, as the Allies were concerned that the Czech Resistance movement was in danger of being completely dismantled by the Germans. Before he was deployed, Pechal was promoted to first lieutenant.

Having completed his training, Pechal and two other Czech operatives (collectively code-named ZINC) were dropped behind German lines on 28 March 1942. The intended target of the drop was Moravia, but a navigational error resulted in the trio being dropped near the village of Gbely in Slovakia, forcing the three to split up and cross into Moravia on foot. During his crossing, Pechal was briefly detained by two German customs officers, who assumed he was a smuggler. Pechal escaped custody and killed one of the officers, but was forced to flee without his supplies - including his forged identification papers, which were recovered by the Gestapo.

Pechal was able to remain hidden in the woods, but by 2 April the Gestapo were able to confirm his identity and begin a search. Pechal made his way to his parents' house, where he stayed for a night before moving on. Two days later, the German occupational authorities launched a raid against Pechal's home town of Vřesovice, detaining many of Pechal's relatives and other townspeople. Pechal escaped the raid and evaded the occupational authorities for a month, eventually finding shelter with two parish priests, Václav Kostiha and František Voneš, in Ždánice. However, several days later Pechal was contacted by a former resistance member turned German collaborator, who offered to escort Pechal to Bres and re-establish communications with London. The collaborator lured Pechal into a trap, and as such he was captured after a fierce struggle. Both priests who had helped Pechal were also captured and executed.

After his capture by the Germans, Pechal was subjected to a brutal beating, days of harsh interrogation, and was told that 8 members of his family had been executed in retaliation for his activities. However, he refused to crack and did not divulge the identity of his fellow agents or details of his mission. He was transferred to Mauthausen concentration camp, where he was executed by hanging on 22 September 1942.

== Legacy ==
Pechal was awarded the State Defense Cross of the Czech Republic in 2011 and the Medal of Heroism in 2024.
