= Vřesovice (Hodonín District) =

- Municipality
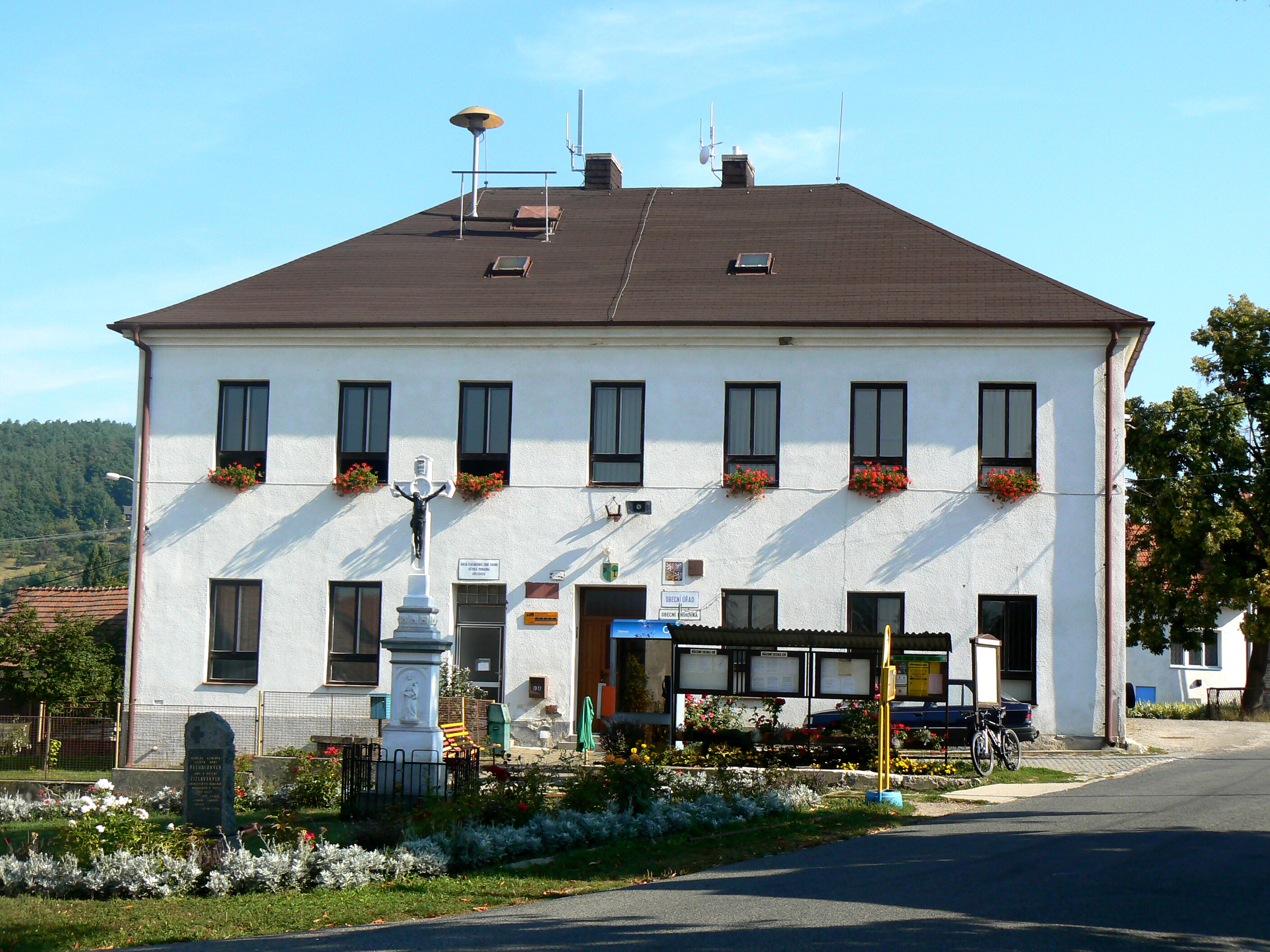
- Municipal office

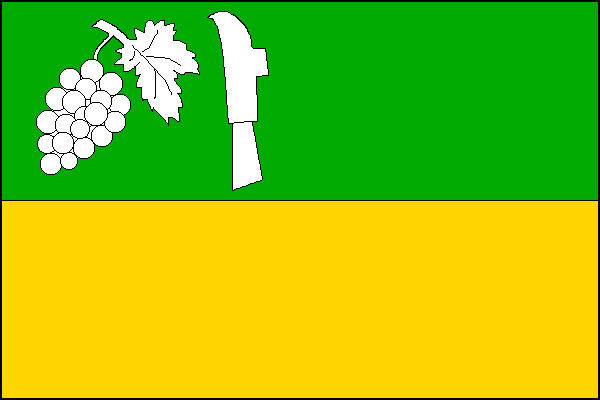
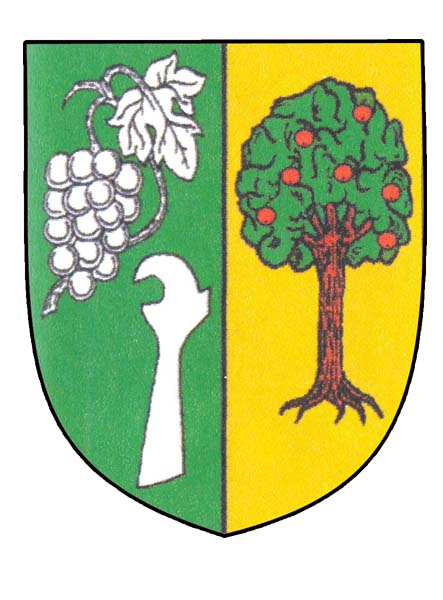
- Flag Coat of arms

- Location in the Czech Republic
- Coordinates: 49°3′33″N 17°12′54″E
- Country: Czech Republic
- Region: South Moravian
- District: Hodonín
- First mentioned: 1358

Area
  - Total: 6.53 km^{2} (2.52 sq mi)
- Elevation: 281 m (922 ft)

Population (2026-01-01)
  - Total: 586
  - Density: 89.7/km^{2} (232/sq mi)
- Time zone: UTC+1 (CET)
  - Summer (DST): UTC+2 (CEST)
- Postal code: 696 48
- Website: www.obecvresovice.cz

Vřesovice is a municipality and village in Hodonín District in the South Moravian Region of the Czech Republic. It has about 600 inhabitants.

Vřesovice lies approximately 25 kilometres (16 mi) north of Hodonín, 46 km (29 mi) east of Brno, and 232 km (144 mi) south-east of Prague.

== Demographics ==
Historical population
Year	Pop.	±%
1869	662	—
1880	731	+10.4%
1890	791	+8.2%
1900	876	+10.7%
1910	963	+9.9%
1921	935	−2.9%
1930	873	−6.6%
1950	710	−18.7%
1961	848	+19.4%
1970	821	−3.2%
1980	753	−8.3%
1991	671	−10.9%
2001	616	−8.2%
2011	599	−2.8%
2021	566	−5.5%
Source: Censuses

== Notable people ==
- Oldřich Pechal (1913–1942), soldier and resistance fighter
