= Buchlov Castle =

Coordinates: 49.1074°N 17.3110°E

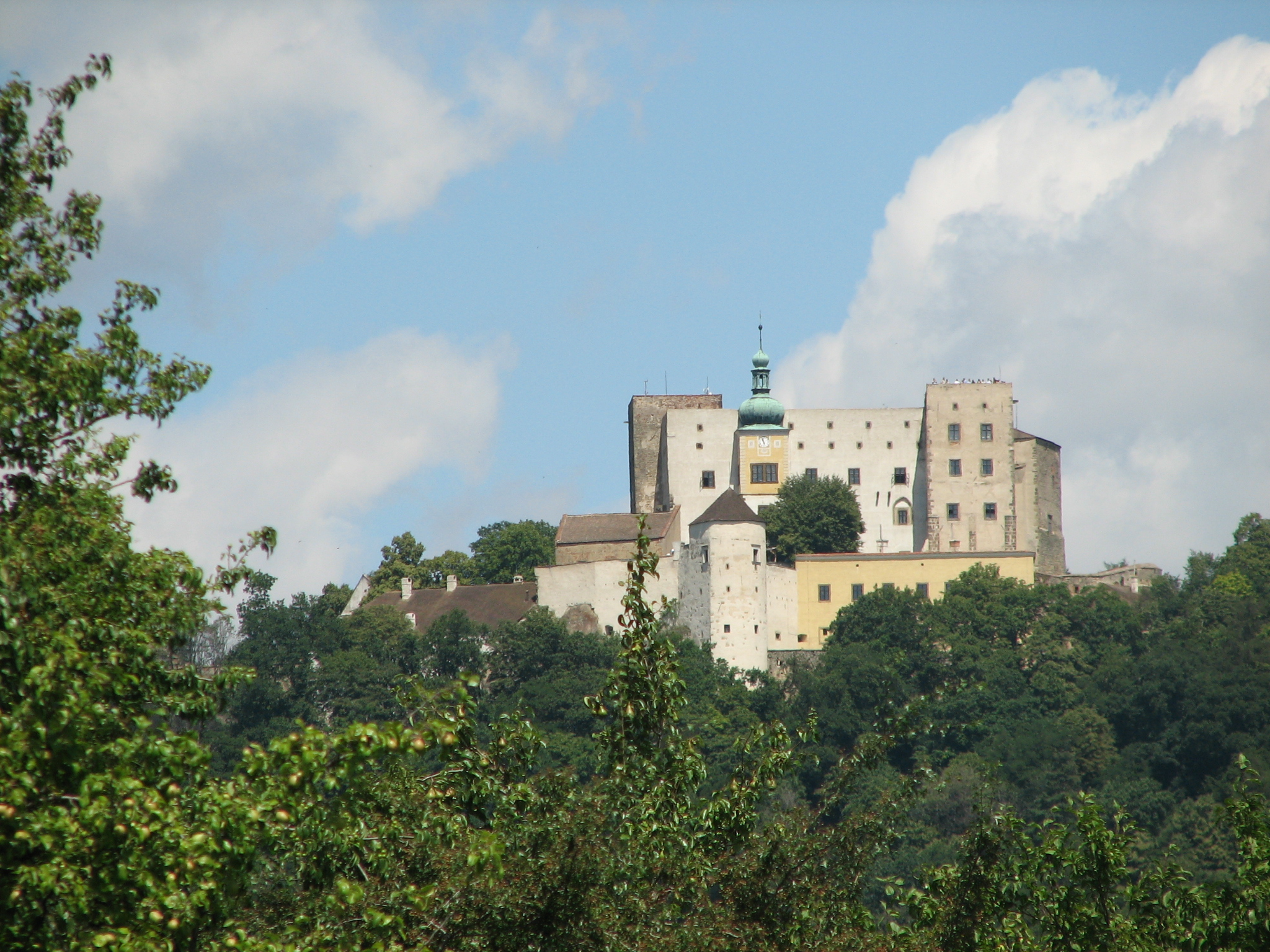
View from the south

Buchlov Castle (Czech: hrad Buchlov; German: Schloss Buchlau) is a royal castle in Buchlovice in the Zlín Region of the Czech Republic It is located on an eponymous hill with an elevation of 508 metres (1,667 ft) within the Chřiby highlands.

== History ==
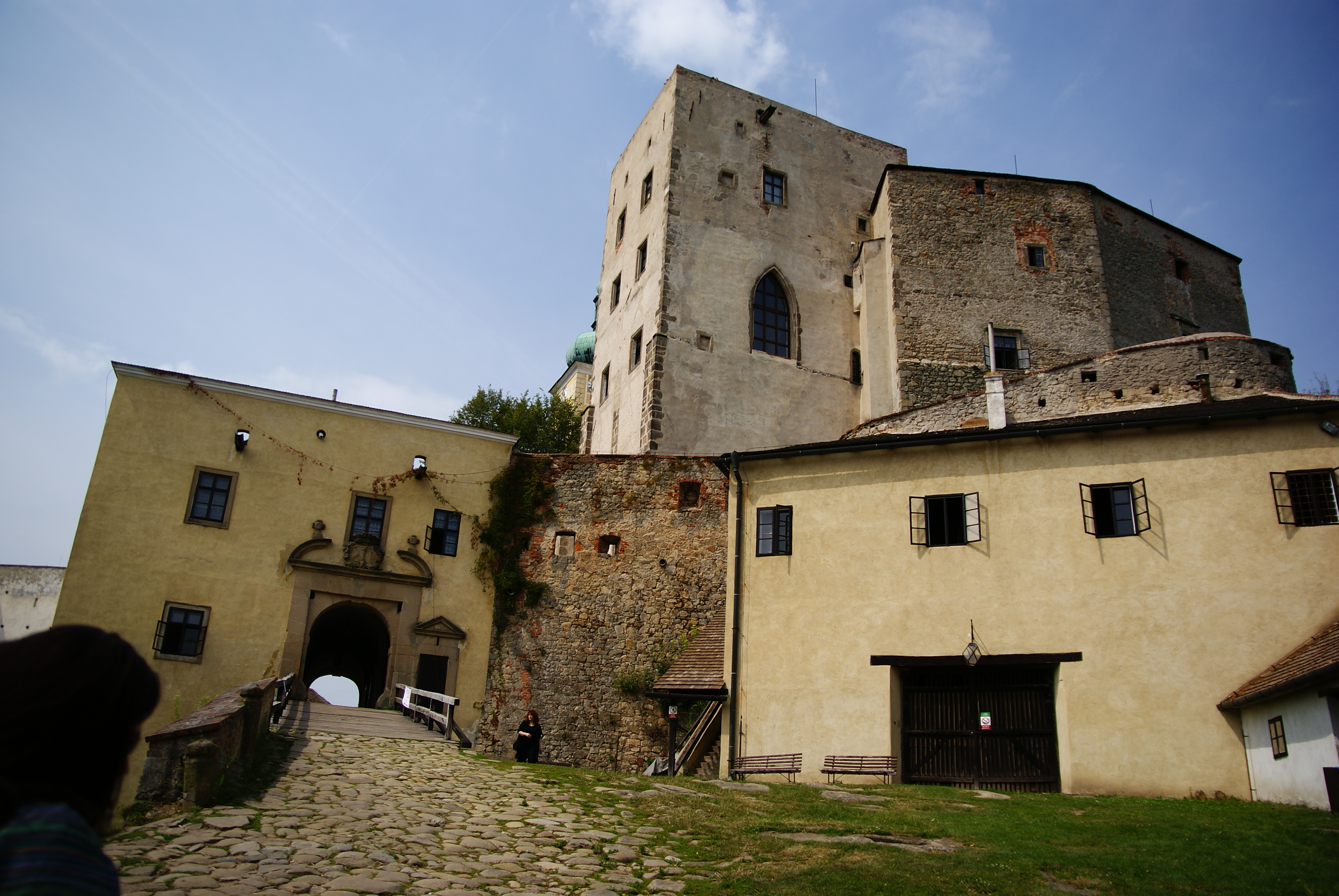
Entrance to the castle

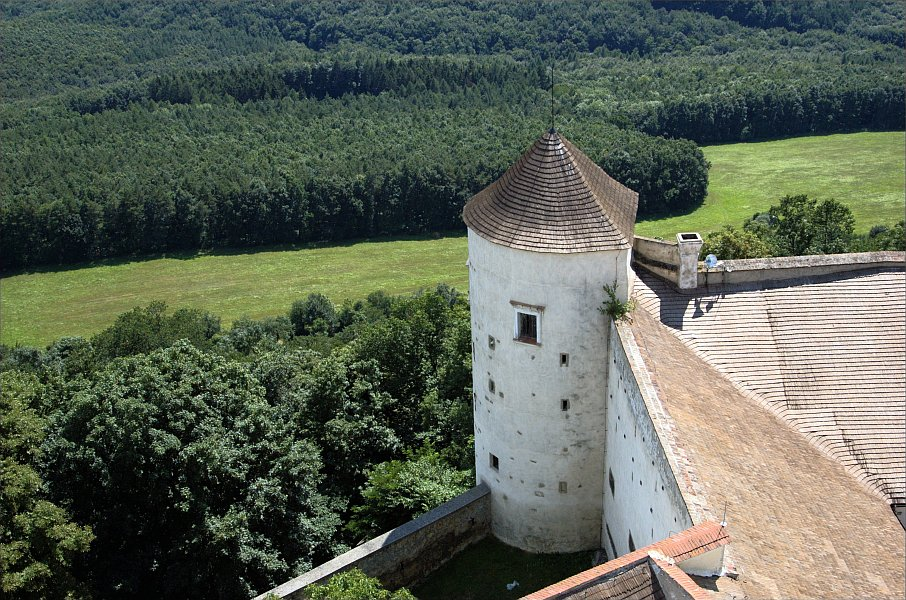
Castle tower

The castle was built approximately in the first part of the 13th century, but archaeological finds suggest that the area around Buchlov was settled in the oldest periods of civilization. The function of the castle was defensive, agricultural and administrative as well.

The first form of the castle had a similar ground-plan as buildings of that era. It was created by two massive prismatic towers situated on opposite parts of a rocky plateau. A high palace on the southern part of the yard was built at the same time and it was surrounded by a wall. The second construction period occurred in the 1370s. Another tower was built and on the second floor of this tower there was a chapel that held the most valuable objects of early Gothic architecture of the day.

There is an opinion that a model for this chapel was one of French royal chapels. Unfortunately, during later capturing of Buchlov Castle by armies of Hungarian king Matthias Corvinus in the second half of the 15th century, the chapel was destroyed to the point that it was abandoned. It was replaced by two large rooms serving as store and depository. And although the castle was a permanent possession of a king until the 16th century, it was often pawned to nobility. Lords of Cimburk owned it at the end of the 15th century. At that time a representative chivalric hall was built. In the year 1511 the castle was sold permanently to a private holder, and from the 16th to 18th century it belonged to various Moravian noble families. The most important were the lords of Žerotín, Zástřizl and Petřvald. Constructional work continued in Renaissance style. Some parts of the castle were added in Baroque style. However, in 1701, the Buchlovice Castle was finished and after 1751 the owners, the Berchtold family, possessed it for almost two centuries.

A family museum was built in the castle thanks to the brothers Leopold Berchtold and Bedřich Berchtold. Leopold Berchtold, who was foreign minister of Austria-Hungary at the beginning of World War I, was buried at Buchlau after his death in November 1942. In 1945, after the end of World War II, the castle was confiscated on the basis of the Beneš decrees and became property of the Czechoslovak state. Later it was added to the list of national cultural monuments. Nowadays it is open to public, and many cultural programs are held each year.

=== Chapel of Saint Barbara ===
Chapel of Saint Barbara was built in the 13th century, and it was used as a funeral crypt for holders of a manor of Buchlov. Later it was rebuilt and finished in the year 1672. It is built in early baroque style on a cruciform plan with a central cupola. It is one kilometre east from Buchlov. Pilgrimage divine services are held to this day.
