= Chřiby =

Coordinates: 49°10′N 17°20′E

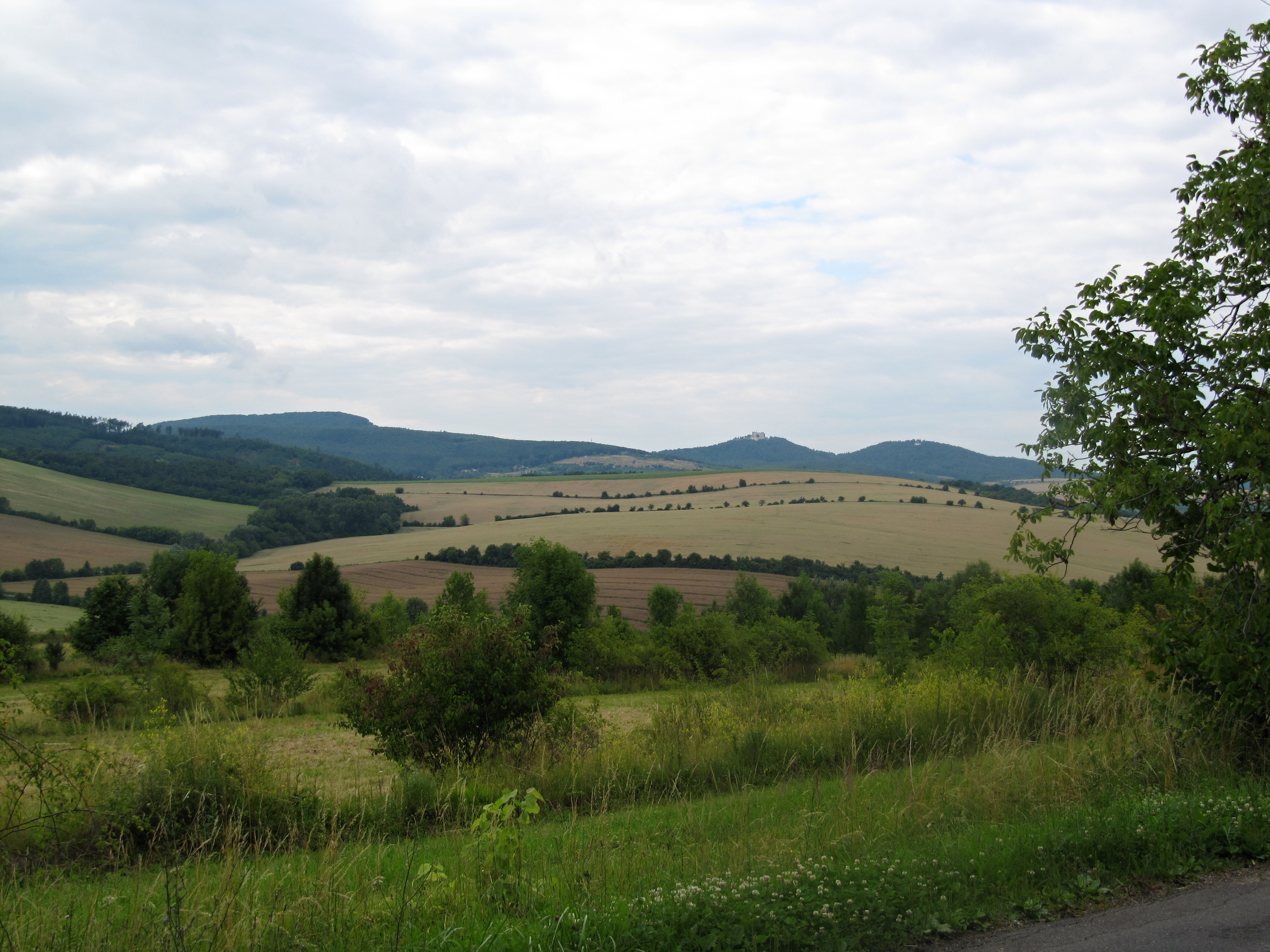
Chřiby Hills

Chřiby (German: Marsgebirge, the "Mars Mountains") is a geographic region of the Czech Republic, part of the Central Moravian Carpathians of the Outer Western Carpathians.

The area is a 335 square kilometres (129 sq mi) nature park and tourist park, offering a variety of natural features, rock formations, and historical monuments. Chřiby is the highest portion of the Central Moravian Carpathiants, composed of clay and sandstone cliffs, covered by dense deciduous forest, crossed by the Morava River, and dotted with Czech national parks and nature reserves. The highest point is Brdo, at 586 metres (1,923 ft).

The name Chřiby is of ancient origin. The region was populated by humans as early as the Paleolithic era, and on the medieval trade route from the Adriatic to the Baltic; among the many historical resources of the area is Buchlov Castle, dating from the 13th century.
